= Borel graph theorem =

In functional analysis, the Borel graph theorem is generalization of the closed graph theorem that was proven by L. Schwartz.

The Borel graph theorem shows that the closed graph theorem is valid for linear maps defined on and valued in most spaces encountered in analysis.

== Statement ==
A topological space is called a Polish space if it is a separable complete metrizable space and that a Souslin space is the continuous image of a Polish space. The weak dual of a separable Fréchet space and the strong dual of a separable Fréchet–Montel space are Souslin spaces. Also, the space of distributions and all Lp-spaces over open subsets of Euclidean space as well as many other spaces that occur in analysis are Souslin spaces. The Borel graph theorem states:

Let $X$ and $Y$ be Hausdorff locally convex spaces and let $u : X \to Y$ be linear. If $X$ is the inductive limit of an arbitrary family of Banach spaces, if $Y$ is a Souslin space, and if the graph of $u$ is a Borel set in $X \times Y,$ then $u$ is continuous.

== Generalization ==
An improvement upon this theorem, proved by A. Martineau, uses K-analytic spaces. A topological space $X$ is called a $K_{\sigma \delta}$ if it is the countable intersection of countable unions of compact sets. A Hausdorff topological space $Y$ is called K-analytic if it is the continuous image of a $K_{\sigma \delta}$ space (that is, if there is a $K_{\sigma \delta}$ space $X$ and a continuous map of $X$ onto $Y$). Every compact set is K-analytic so that there are non-separable K-analytic spaces. Also, every Polish, Souslin, and reflexive Fréchet space is K-analytic as is the weak dual of a Fréchet space. The generalized theorem states:

Let $X$ and $Y$ be locally convex Hausdorff spaces and let $u : X \to Y$ be linear. If $X$ is the inductive limit of an arbitrary family of Banach spaces, if $Y$ is a K-analytic space, and if the graph of $u$ is closed in $X \times Y,$ then $u$ is continuous.

== See also ==
- Closed graph property – Graph of a map closed in the product space
- Closed graph theorem – Theorem relating continuity to graphs
- Closed graph theorem (functional analysis) – Theorems connecting continuity to closure of graphs
- Graph of a function – Representation of a mathematical function

== Bibliography ==
- Trèves, François (2006) [1967]. Topological Vector Spaces, Distributions and Kernels. Mineola, N.Y.: Dover Publications. ISBN 978-0-486-45352-1. OCLC 853623322.
