= Closed graph theorem (functional analysis) =

Theorems connecting continuity to closure of graphs

In mathematics, particularly in functional analysis, the closed graph theorem is a result connecting the continuity of a linear operator to a topological property of their graph. Precisely, the theorem states that a linear operator between two Banach spaces is continuous if and only if the graph of the operator is closed (such an operator is called a closed linear operator; see also closed graph property).

Since an operator between two normed spaces is a bounded linear operator if and only if it is a continuous linear operator, one can replace "continuous" with "bounded" in the statement above.

An important question in functional analysis is whether a given linear operator is continuous (or bounded). The closed graph theorem gives one answer to that question.

== Explanation ==
Let $T : X \to Y$ be a linear operator between Banach spaces (or more generally Fréchet spaces). Then the continuity of $T$ means that $Tx_i \to Tx$ for each convergent sequence $x_i \to x$. On the other hand, the closedness of the graph of $T$ means that for each convergent sequence $x_i \to x$ such that $Tx_i \to y$, we have $y = Tx$. Hence, the closed graph theorem says that in order to check the continuity of $T$, one can show $T x_i \to Tx$ under the additional assumption that $Tx_i$ is convergent.

In fact, for the graph of T to be closed, it is enough that if $x_i \to 0, \, Tx_i \to y$, then $y = 0$. Indeed, assuming that condition holds, if $(x_i, Tx_i) \to (x, y)$, then $x_i - x \to 0$ and $T(x_i - x) \to y - Tx$. Thus, $y = Tx$; i.e., $(x, y)$ is in the graph of T.

Note, to check the closedness of a graph, it's not even necessary to use the norm topology: if the graph of T is closed in some topology coarser than the norm topology, then it is closed in the norm topology. In practice, this works like this: T is some operator on some function space. One shows T is continuous with respect to the distribution topology; thus, the graph is closed in that topology, which implies closedness in the norm topology. If the closed graph theorem applies, then T is continuous under the original topology. See § Example for an explicit example.

== Statement ==
Theorem— If $T : X \to Y$ is a linear operator between Banach spaces (or more generally Fréchet spaces), then the following are equivalent:

1. $T$ is continuous.
2. The graph of $T$ is closed in the product topology on $X \times Y.$

The usual proof of the closed graph theorem employs the open mapping theorem. It simply uses a general recipe of obtaining the closed graph theorem from the open mapping theorem; see closed graph theorem § Relation to the open mapping theorem (this deduction is formal and does not use linearity; the linearity is needed to appeal to the open mapping theorem which relies on the linearity.)

In fact, the open mapping theorem can in turn be deduced from the closed graph theorem as follows. As noted in Open mapping theorem (functional analysis) § Statement and proof, it is enough to prove the open mapping theorem for a continuous linear operator that is bijective (not just surjective). Let T be such an operator. Then by continuity, the graph $\Gamma_T$ of T is closed. Then $\Gamma_T \simeq \Gamma_{T^{-1}}$ under $(x, y) \mapsto (y, x)$. Hence, by the closed graph theorem, $T^{-1}$ is continuous; i.e., T is an open mapping.

Since the closed graph theorem is equivalent to the open mapping theorem, one knows that the theorem fails without the completeness assumption. But more concretely, an operator with closed graph that is not bounded (see unbounded operator) exists and thus serves as a counterexample.

== Example ==
The Hausdorff–Young inequality says that the Fourier transformation $\widehat{\cdot} : L^p(\mathbb{R}^n) \to L^{p'}(\mathbb{R}^n)$ is a well-defined bounded operator with operator norm one when $1/p + 1/p' = 1$. This result is usually proved using the Riesz–Thorin interpolation theorem and is highly nontrivial. The closed graph theorem can be used to prove a soft version of this result; i.e., the Fourier transformation is a bounded operator with the unknown operator norm.

Here is how the argument would go. Let T denote the Fourier transformation. First we show $T : L^p \to Z$ is a continuous linear operator for Z = the space of tempered distributions on $\mathbb{R}^n$. Second, we note that T maps the space of Schwartz functions to itself (in short, because smoothness and rapid decay transform to rapid decay and smoothness, respectively). This implies that the graph of T is contained in $L^p \times L^{p'}$ and $T : L^p \to L^{p'}$ is defined but with unknown bounds. Since $T : L^p \to Z$ is continuous, the graph of $T : L^p \to L^{p'}$ is closed in the distribution topology; thus in the norm topology. Finally, by the closed graph theorem, $T : L^p \to L^{p'}$ is a bounded operator.

== Generalization ==
=== On Hilbert spaces ===
Let $H$ be a Hilbert space, and $A: D(A) \subset H \to H$ be a possibly partially-defined linear operator.

Define the graph inner product on $D(A)$ by $\langle x, y\rangle_{G(A)}=\langle x, y\rangle+\langle A x, A y\rangle$, and similarly the graph norm $\|x \|_{G(A)} = \sqrt{\|x\|^2 + \|Ax\|^2}$. We have the following:

- $A$ is closed iff $(D(A), \|\cdot \|_{G(A)})$ is Banach.
- If $A$ is bounded, then $A$ is closed iff $D(A)$ is closed.

=== Complete metrizable codomain ===
The closed graph theorem can be generalized from Banach spaces to more abstract topological vector spaces in the following ways.

Theorem—A linear operator from a barrelled space $X$ to a Fréchet space $Y$ is continuous if and only if its graph is closed.

==== Between F-spaces ====
There are versions that does not require $Y$ to be locally convex.

Theorem—A linear map between two F-spaces is continuous if and only if its graph is closed.

This theorem is restated and extend it with some conditions that can be used to determine if a graph is closed:

Theorem—If $T : X \to Y$ is a linear map between two F-spaces, then the following are equivalent:

1. $T$ is continuous.
2. $T$ has a closed graph.
3. If $x_{\bull} = \left(x_i\right)_{i=1}^{\infty} \to x$ in $X$ and if $T\left(x_{\bull}\right) := \left(T\left(x_i\right)\right)_{i=1}^{\infty}$ converges in $Y$ to some $y \in Y,$ then $y = T(x).$
4. If $x_{\bull} = \left(x_i\right)_{i=1}^{\infty} \to 0$ in $X$ and if $T\left(x_{\bull}\right)$ converges in $Y$ to some $y \in Y,$ then $y = 0.$

=== Complete pseudometrizable codomain ===
Every metrizable topological space is pseudometrizable. A pseudometrizable space is metrizable if and only if it is Hausdorff.

Closed graph theorem—Also, a closed linear map from a locally convex ultrabarrelled space into a complete pseudometrizable TVS is continuous.

Closed graph theorem—A closed and bounded linear map from a locally convex infrabarreled space into a complete pseudometrizable locally convex space is continuous.

=== Codomain not complete or (pseudo) metrizable ===
Theorem—Suppose that $T : X \to Y$ is a linear map whose graph is closed. If $X$ is an inductive limit of Baire TVSs and $Y$ is a webbed space then $T$ is continuous.

Closed graph theorem—A closed surjective linear map from a complete pseudometrizable TVS onto a locally convex ultrabarrelled space is continuous.

An even more general version of the closed graph theorem is

Theorem—Suppose that $X$ and $Y$ are two topological vector spaces (they need not be Hausdorff or locally convex) with the following property:

If $G$ is any closed subspace of $X \times Y$ and $u$ is any continuous map of $G$ onto $X,$ then $u$ is an open mapping.

Under this condition, if $T : X \to Y$ is a linear map whose graph is closed then $T$ is continuous.

== Borel graph theorem ==
The Borel graph theorem, proved by L. Schwartz, shows that the closed graph theorem is valid for linear maps defined on and valued in most spaces encountered in analysis.

Recall that a topological space is called a Polish space if it is a separable complete metrizable space and that a Souslin space is the continuous image of a Polish space. The weak dual of a separable Fréchet space and the strong dual of a separable Fréchet-Montel space are Souslin spaces. Also, the space of distributions and all Lp-spaces over open subsets of Euclidean space as well as many other spaces that occur in analysis are Souslin spaces.

The Borel graph theorem states:

Borel graph theorem—Let $u : X \to Y$ be linear map between two locally convex Hausdorff spaces $X$ and $Y.$ If $X$ is the inductive limit of an arbitrary family of Banach spaces, if $Y$ is a Souslin space, and if the graph of $u$ is a Borel set in $X \times Y,$ then $u$ is continuous.

An improvement upon this theorem, proved by A. Martineau, uses K-analytic spaces.

A topological space $X$ is called a $K_{\sigma\delta}$ if it is the countable intersection of countable unions of compact sets.

A Hausdorff topological space $Y$ is called K-analytic if it is the continuous image of a $K_{\sigma\delta}$ space (that is, if there is a $K_{\sigma\delta}$ space $X$ and a continuous map of $X$ onto $Y$).

Every compact set is K-analytic so that there are non-separable K-analytic spaces. Also, every Polish, Souslin, and reflexive Fréchet space is K-analytic, as is the weak dual of a Frechet space. The generalized Borel graph theorem states:

Generalized Borel graph theorem—Let $u : X \to Y$ be a linear map between two locally convex Hausdorff spaces $X$ and $Y.$ If $X$ is the inductive limit of an arbitrary family of Banach spaces, if $Y$ is a K-analytic space, and if the graph of $u$ is closed in $X \times Y,$ then $u$ is continuous.

== Related results ==
If $F : X \to Y$ is closed linear operator from a Hausdorff locally convex TVS $X$ into a Hausdorff finite-dimensional TVS $Y$ then $F$ is continuous.

== See also ==
- Almost open linear map – Map that satisfies a condition similar to that of being an open map
- Barrelled space – Type of topological vector space
- Closed graph – Property of functions in topology
- Closed linear operator – Linear operator whose graph is closed
- Densely defined operator – Linear operator on dense subset of its apparent domain
- Discontinuous linear map
- Kakutani fixed-point theorem – Fixed-point theorem for set-valued functions
- Open mapping theorem (functional analysis) – Condition for a linear operator to be open
- Ursescu theorem – Generalization of closed graph, open mapping, and uniform boundedness theorem
- Webbed space – Space where open mapping and closed graph theorems hold
