= Open mapping theorem =

Open mapping theorem may refer to:

- Open mapping theorem (functional analysis) (also known as the Banach–Schauder theorem), states that a surjective continuous linear transformation of a Banach space X onto a Banach space Y is an open mapping
- Open mapping theorem (complex analysis), states that a non-constant holomorphic function on a connected open set in the complex plane is an open mapping
- Open mapping theorem (topological groups), states that a surjective continuous homomorphism of a locally compact Hausdorff group G onto a locally compact Hausdorff group H is an open mapping if G is σ-compact. Like the open mapping theorem in functional analysis, the proof in the setting of topological groups uses the Baire category theorem.

== See also ==
- In calculus, part of the inverse function theorem which states that a continuously differentiable function between Euclidean spaces whose derivative matrix is invertible at a point is an open mapping in a neighborhood of the point. More generally, if a mapping F : U → R^{m} from an open set U ⊂ R^{n} to R^{m} is such that the Jacobian derivative dF(x) is surjective at every point x ∈ U, then F is an open mapping.
- The invariance of domain theorem shows that certain mappings between subsets of R^{n} are open.
