= Webbed space =

Space where open mapping and closed graph theorems hold

In mathematics, particularly in functional analysis, a webbed space is a topological vector space designed with the goal of allowing the results of the open mapping theorem and the closed graph theorem to hold for a wider class of linear maps whose codomains are webbed spaces. A space is called webbed if there exists a collection of sets, called a web that satisfies certain properties. Webs were first investigated by de Wilde.

== Web ==
Let $X$ be a Hausdorff locally convex topological vector space. A web is a stratified collection of disks satisfying the following absorbency and convergence requirements.

1. Stratum 1: The first stratum must consist of a sequence $D_{1}, D_{2}, D_{3}, \ldots$ of disks in $X$ such that their union $\bigcup_{i \in \N} D_i$ absorbs $X.$
2. Stratum 2: For each disk $D_i$ in the first stratum, there must exists a sequence $D_{i1}, D_{i2}, D_{i3}, \ldots$ of disks in $X$ such that for every $D_i$: $D_{ij} \subseteq \left(\tfrac{1}{2}\right) D_i \quad \text{ for every } j$ and $\cup_{j \in \N} D_{ij}$ absorbs $D_i.$ The sets $\left(D_{ij}\right)_{i,j \in \N}$ will form the second stratum.
3. Stratum 3: To each disk $D_{ij}$ in the second stratum, assign another sequence $D_{ij1}, D_{ij2}, D_{ij3}, \ldots$ of disks in $X$ satisfying analogously defined properties; explicitly, this means that for every $D_{i,j}$: $D_{ijk} \subseteq \left(\tfrac{1}{2}\right) D_{ij} \quad \text{ for every } k$ and $\cup_{k \in \N} D_{ijk}$ absorbs $D_{ij}.$ The sets $\left(D_{ijk}\right)_{i,j,k \in \N}$ form the third stratum.

Continue this process to define strata $4, 5, \ldots.$ That is, use induction to define stratum $n + 1$ in terms of stratum $n.$

A strand is a sequence of disks, with the first disk being selected from the first stratum, say $D_i,$ and the second being selected from the sequence that was associated with $D_i,$ and so on. We also require that if a sequence of vectors $(x_n)$ is selected from a strand (with $x_1$ belonging to the first disk in the strand, $x_2$ belonging to the second, and so on) then the series $\sum_{n = 1}^{\infty} x_n$ converges.

A Hausdorff locally convex topological vector space on which a web can be defined is called a webbed space.

== Examples and sufficient conditions ==
Theorem (de Wilde 1978)—A topological vector space $X$ is a Fréchet space if and only if it is both a webbed space and a Baire space.

All of the following spaces are webbed:

- Fréchet spaces.
- Projective limits and inductive limits of sequences of webbed spaces.
- A sequentially closed vector subspace of a webbed space.
- Countable products of webbed spaces.
- A Hausdorff quotient of a webbed space.
- The image of a webbed space under a sequentially continuous linear map if that image is Hausdorff.
- The bornologification of a webbed space.
- The continuous dual space of a metrizable locally convex space endowed with the strong dual topology is webbed.
- If $X$ is the strict inductive limit of a denumerable family of locally convex metrizable spaces, then the continuous dual space of $X$ with the strong topology is webbed.
  - So in particular, the strong duals of locally convex metrizable spaces are webbed.
- If $X$ is a webbed space, then any Hausdorff locally convex topology weaker than this (webbed) topology is also webbed.

== Theorems ==
Closed Graph Theorem—Let $A : X \to Y$ be a linear map between TVSs that is sequentially closed (meaning that its graph is a sequentially closed subset of $X \times Y$). If $Y$ is a webbed space and $X$ is an ultrabornological space (such as a Fréchet space or an inductive limit of Fréchet spaces), then $A$ is continuous.

Closed Graph Theorem—Any closed linear map from the inductive limit of Baire locally convex spaces into a webbed locally convex space is continuous.

Open Mapping Theorem—Any continuous surjective linear map from a webbed locally convex space onto an inductive limit of Baire locally convex spaces is open.

Open Mapping Theorem—Any continuous surjective linear map from a webbed locally convex space onto an ultrabornological space is open.

Open Mapping Theorem—If the image of a closed linear operator $A : X \to Y$ from locally convex webbed space $X$ into Hausdorff locally convex space $Y$ is nonmeager in $Y$ then $A : X \to Y$ is a surjective open map.

If the spaces are not locally convex, then there is a notion of web where the requirement of being a disk is replaced by the requirement of being balanced. For such a notion of web we have the following results:

Closed Graph Theorem—Any closed linear map from the inductive limit of Baire topological vector spaces into a webbed topological vector space is continuous.

== See also ==
- Almost open linear map – Map that satisfies a condition similar to that of being an open map.
- Barrelled space – Type of topological vector space
- Closed graph – Graph of a map closed in the product space
- Closed graph theorem (functional analysis) – Theorems connecting continuity to closure of graphs
- Closed linear operator
- Discontinuous linear map
- F-space – Topological vector space with a complete translation-invariant metric
- Fréchet space – A locally convex topological vector space that is also a complete metric space
- Kakutani fixed-point theorem – Fixed-point theorem for set-valued functions
- Metrizable topological vector space – A topological vector space whose topology can be defined by a metric
- Open mapping theorem (functional analysis) – Condition for a linear operator to be open
- Ursescu theorem – Generalization of closed graph, open mapping, and uniform boundedness theorem
