= Discontinuous linear map =

Property of topological functions

In mathematics, linear maps form an important class of "simple" functions which preserve the algebraic structure of linear spaces and are often used as approximations to more general functions (see linear approximation). If the spaces involved are also topological spaces (that is, topological vector spaces), then it makes sense to ask whether all linear maps are continuous. It turns out that for maps defined on infinite-dimensional topological vector spaces (e.g., infinite-dimensional normed spaces), the answer is generally no: there exist discontinuous linear maps. If the domain of definition is complete, it is trickier; such maps can be proven to exist, but the proof relies on the axiom of choice and does not provide an explicit example.

== A linear map from a finite-dimensional space is always continuous ==
Let X and Y be two normed spaces and $f : X \to Y$ a linear map from X to Y. If X is finite-dimensional, choose a basis $\left(e_1, e_2, \ldots, e_n\right)$ in X which may be taken to be unit vectors. Then,
$$f(x) = \sum^n_{i=1} x_if(e_i),$$
and so by the triangle inequality,
$$\|f(x)\| = \left\|\sum^n_{i=1} x_if(e_i)\right\| \leq \sum^n_{i=1} |x_i|\|f(e_i)\|.$$
Letting
$$M = \sup_i \{\|f(e_i)\|\},$$
and using the fact that
$$\sum^n_{i=1}|x_i|\leq C \|x\|$$
for some C>0 which follows from the fact that any two norms on a finite-dimensional space are equivalent, one finds
$$\|f(x)\| \leq \left(\sum^n_{i=1}|x_i|\right)M \leq CM\|x\|.$$
Thus, $f$ is a bounded linear operator and so is continuous. In fact, to see this, simply note that f is linear, and therefore $\|f(x)-f(x')\| = \|f(x-x')\| \leq K \|x-x'\|$ for some universal constant K. Thus for any $\epsilon>0,$ we can choose $\delta \leq \epsilon/K$ so that $f(B(x,\delta)) \subseteq B(f(x), \epsilon)$ ($B(x, \delta)$ and $B(f(x), \epsilon)$ are the normed balls around $x$ and $f(x)$), which gives continuity.

If X is infinite-dimensional, this proof will fail as there is no guarantee that the supremum M exists. If Y is the zero space {0}, the only map between X and Y is the zero map which is trivially continuous. In all other cases, when X is infinite-dimensional and Y is not the zero space, one can find a discontinuous map from X to Y.

== A concrete example ==
Examples of discontinuous linear maps are easy to construct in spaces that are not complete; on any Cauchy sequence $e_i$ of linearly independent vectors which does not have a limit, there is a linear operator $T$ such that the quantities $\|T(e_i)\|/\|e_i\|$ grow without bound. In a sense, the linear operators are not continuous because the space has "holes".

For example, consider the space $X$ of real-valued smooth functions on the interval [0, 1] with the uniform norm, that is,
$$\|f\| = \sup_{x\in [0, 1]}|f(x)|.$$
The derivative-at-a-point map, given by
$$T(f) = f'(0)\,$$
defined on $X$ and with real values, is linear, but not continuous. Indeed, consider the sequence
$$f_n(x)=\frac{\sin (n^2 x)}{n}$$
for $n \geq 1$. This sequence converges uniformly to the constantly zero function, but
$$T(f_n) = \frac{n^2\cos(n^2 \cdot 0)}{n} = n\to \infty$$

as $n \to \infty$ instead of $T(f_n)\to T(0)=0$, as would hold for a continuous map. Note that $T$ is real-valued, and so is actually a linear functional on $X$ (an element of the algebraic dual space $X^*$). The linear map $X \to X$ which assigns to each function its derivative is similarly discontinuous. Note that although the derivative operator is not continuous, it is closed.

The fact that the domain is not complete here is important: discontinuous operators on complete spaces require a little more work.

== A nonconstructive example ==
An algebraic basis for the real numbers as a vector space over the rationals is known as a Hamel basis (note that some authors use this term in a broader sense to mean an algebraic basis of any vector space). Note that any two noncommensurable numbers, say 1 and $\pi$, are linearly independent. One may find a Hamel basis containing them, and define a map $f : \R \to \R$ so that $f(\pi) = 0,$ f acts as the identity on the rest of the Hamel basis, and extend to all of $\R$ by linearity. Let {r_{n}}_{n} be any sequence of rationals which converges to $\pi$. Then lim_{n} f(r_{n}) = π, but $f(\pi) = 0.$ By construction, f is linear over $\Q$ (not over $\R$), but not continuous. Note that f is also not measurable; an additive real function is linear if and only if it is measurable, so for every such function there is a Vitali set. The construction of f relies on the axiom of choice.

This example can be extended into a general theorem about the existence of discontinuous linear maps on any infinite-dimensional normed space (as long as the codomain is not trivial).

== General existence theorem ==
Discontinuous linear maps can be proven to exist more generally, even if the space is complete. Let X and Y be normed spaces over the field K where $K = \R$ or $K = \Complex.$ Assume that X is infinite-dimensional and Y is not the zero space. We will find a discontinuous linear map f from X to K, which will imply the existence of a discontinuous linear map g from X to Y given by the formula $g(x) = f(x) y_0$ where $y_0$ is an arbitrary nonzero vector in Y.

If X is infinite-dimensional, to show the existence of a linear functional which is not continuous then amounts to constructing f which is not bounded. For that, consider a sequence (e_{n})_{n} ($n \geq 1$) of linearly independent vectors in X, which we normalize. Then, we define
$$T(e_n) = n\|e_n\|\,$$
for each $n = 1, 2, \ldots$ Complete this sequence of linearly independent vectors to a vector space basis of X by defining T at the other vectors in the basis to be zero. T so defined will extend uniquely to a linear map on X, and since it is clearly not bounded, it is not continuous.

Notice that by using the fact that any set of linearly independent vectors can be completed to a basis, we implicitly used the axiom of choice, which was not needed for the concrete example in the previous section.

== Role of the axiom of choice ==
As noted above, the axiom of choice (AC) is used in the general existence theorem of discontinuous linear maps. In fact, there are no constructive examples of discontinuous linear maps with complete domain (for example, Banach spaces). In analysis as it is usually practiced by working mathematicians, the axiom of choice is always employed (it is an axiom of ZFC set theory); thus, to the analyst, all infinite-dimensional topological vector spaces admit discontinuous linear maps.

On the other hand, in 1970 Robert M. Solovay exhibited a model of set theory in which every set of reals is measurable. This implies that there are no discontinuous linear real functions. Clearly AC does not hold in the model.

Solovay's result shows that it is not necessary to assume that all infinite-dimensional vector spaces admit discontinuous linear maps, and there are schools of analysis which adopt a more constructivist viewpoint. For example, H. G. Garnir, in searching for so-called "dream spaces" (topological vector spaces on which every linear map into a normed space is continuous), was led to adopt ZF + DC + BP (dependent choice is a weakened form and the Baire property is a negation of strong AC) as his axioms to prove the Garnir–Wright closed graph theorem which states, among other things, that any linear map from an F-space to a TVS is continuous. Going to the extreme of constructivism, there is Ceitin's theorem, which states that every function is continuous (this is to be understood in the terminology of constructivism, according to which only representable functions are considered to be functions). Such stances are held by only a small minority of working mathematicians.

The upshot is that the existence of discontinuous linear maps depends on AC; it is consistent with set theory without AC that there are no discontinuous linear maps on complete spaces. In particular, no concrete construction such as the derivative can succeed in defining a discontinuous linear map everywhere on a complete space.

== Closed operators ==
Many naturally occurring linear discontinuous operators are closed, a class of operators which share some of the features of continuous operators. It makes sense to ask which linear operators on a given space are closed. The closed graph theorem asserts that an everywhere-defined closed operator on a complete domain is continuous, so to obtain a discontinuous closed operator, one must permit operators which are not defined everywhere.

To be more concrete, let $T$ be a map from $X$ to $Y$ with domain $\operatorname{Dom}(T),$ written $T : \operatorname{Dom}(T) \subseteq X \to Y.$ We don't lose much if we replace X by the closure of $\operatorname{Dom}(T).$ That is, in studying operators that are not everywhere-defined, one may restrict one's attention to densely defined operators without loss of generality.

If the graph $\Gamma(T)$ of $T$ is closed in $X \times Y,$ we call T closed. Otherwise, consider its closure $\overline{\Gamma(T)}$ in $X \times Y.$ If $\overline{\Gamma(T)}$ is itself the graph of some operator $\overline{T},$ $T$ is called closable, and $\overline{T}$ is called the closure of $T.$

So the natural question to ask about linear operators that are not everywhere-defined is whether they are closable. The answer is, "not necessarily"; indeed, every infinite-dimensional normed space admits linear operators that are not closable. As in the case of discontinuous operators considered above, the proof requires the axiom of choice and so is in general nonconstructive, though again, if X is not complete, there are constructible examples.

In fact, there is even an example of a linear operator whose graph has closure all of $X \times Y.$ Such an operator is not closable. Let X be the space of polynomial functions from [0,1] to $\R$ and Y the space of polynomial functions from [2,3] to $\R$. They are subspaces of C([0,1]) and C([2,3]) respectively, and so normed spaces. Define an operator T which takes the polynomial function x ↦ p(x) on [0,1] to the same function on [2,3]. As a consequence of the Stone–Weierstrass theorem, the graph of this operator is dense in $X \times Y,$ so this provides a sort of maximally discontinuous linear map (confer nowhere continuous function). Note that X is not complete here, as must be the case when there is such a constructible map.

== Impact for dual spaces ==
The dual space of a topological vector space is the collection of continuous linear maps from the space into the underlying field. Thus the failure of some linear maps to be continuous for infinite-dimensional normed spaces implies that for these spaces, one needs to distinguish the algebraic dual space from the continuous dual space which is then a proper subset. It illustrates the fact that an extra dose of caution is needed in doing analysis on infinite-dimensional spaces as compared to finite-dimensional ones.

== Beyond normed spaces ==
The argument for the existence of discontinuous linear maps on normed spaces can be generalized to all metrizable topological vector spaces, especially to all Fréchet spaces, but there exist infinite-dimensional locally convex topological vector spaces such that every functional is continuous. On the other hand, the Hahn–Banach theorem, which applies to all locally convex spaces, guarantees the existence of many continuous linear functionals, and so a large dual space. In fact, to every convex set, the Minkowski gauge associates a continuous linear functional. The upshot is that spaces with fewer convex sets have fewer functionals, and in the worst-case scenario, a space may have no functionals at all other than the zero functional. This is the case for the $L^p(\R, dx)$ spaces with $0 < p < 1,$ from which it follows that these spaces are nonconvex. Note that here is indicated the Lebesgue measure on the real line. There are other $L^p$ spaces with $0 < p < 1$ which do have nontrivial dual spaces.

Another such example is the space of real-valued measurable functions on the unit interval with quasinorm given by
$$\|f\| = \int_I \frac{|f(x)|}{1+|f(x)|}dx.$$
This non-locally convex space has a trivial dual space.

One can consider even more general spaces. For example, the existence of a homomorphism between complete separable metric groups can also be shown nonconstructively.

== See also ==
- Finest locally convex topology – Space with topology generated by convex sets
- Sublinear function – Type of function in linear algebra
