= Quasi-open map =

Generalization of open map in topology

In topology, a branch of mathematics, a quasi-open map (also called quasi-interior map) is a function that generalizes the notion of open map.

== Definition ==
A function $f:X\to Y$ between topological spaces is called quasi-open if, for any nonempty open set $U\subseteq X$, the interior of $f(U)$ in $Y$ is nonempty. Such a function has also been called a quasi-interior map.

== Properties ==
Let $f:X\to Y$ be a map between topological spaces.

- If $f$ is continuous, it need not be quasi-open. For example, the constant map $f:\R\to\R$ defined by $f(x)=0$ is continuous but not quasi-open.
- Conversely, if $f$ is quasi-open, it need not be continuous. For example, the map $f:\R\to\R$ defined by $f(x)=x$ if $x<0$ and $f(x)=x+1$ if $x\ge 0$ is quasi-open but not continuous.
- If $f$ is open, then $f$ is quasi-open. The converse is not true in general. For example, the continuous function $f:\R\to\R,x\mapsto\sin(x)$ is quasi-open but not open.
- If $f$ is a local homeomorphism, then $f$ is quasi-open.
- The composition of two quasi-open maps is quasi-open. (Note: This means that if $f:X\to Y$ and $g:Y\to Z$ are both quasi-open, then the function composition $g\circ f: X\to Z$ is quasi-open.)

== See also ==
- Almost open map – Map that satisfies a condition similar to that of being an open map
- Closed graph – Property of functions in topology
- Closed linear operator – Linear operator whose graph is closed
- Open and closed maps – A function that sends open (resp. closed) subsets to open (resp. closed) subsets
- Proper map – Map between topological spaces with the property that the preimage of every compact is compact
- Quotient map (topology) – Topological space construction
