= Almost open =

Almost open may refer to:

- Almost open map
- Almost open set
