= K-space (functional analysis) =

In mathematics, more specifically in functional analysis, a K-space is an F-space $V$ such that every extension of F-spaces (or twisted sum) of the form $0 \rightarrow \R \rightarrow X \rightarrow V \rightarrow 0. \,\!$ is equivalent to the trivial one $0\rightarrow \R \rightarrow \R \times V \rightarrow V \rightarrow 0. \,\!$ where $\R$ is the real line.

== Examples ==
The $\ell^p$ spaces for $0< p < 1$ are K-spaces, as are all finite dimensional Banach spaces.

N. J. Kalton and N. P. Roberts proved that the Banach space $\ell^1$ is not a K-space.

== See also ==
- Compactly generated space – Property of topological spaces
- Gelfand–Shilov space
