= Graph continuous function =

Concept in game theory

In mathematics, particularly in game theory and mathematical economics, a function is graph continuous if its graph—the set of all input-output pairs—is a closed set in the product topology of the domain and codomain. In simpler terms, if a sequence of points on the graph converges, its limit point must also belong to the graph. This concept, related to the closed graph property in functional analysis, allows for a broader class of discontinuous payoff functions while enabling equilibrium analysis in economic models.

Graph continuity gained prominence through the work of Partha Dasgupta and Eric Maskin in their 1986 paper on the existence of equilibria in discontinuous economic games. Unlike standard continuity, which requires small changes in inputs to produce small changes in outputs, graph continuity permits certain well-behaved discontinuities. This property is crucial for establishing equilibria in settings such as auction theory, oligopoly models, and location competition, where payoff discontinuities naturally arise.

== Notation and preliminaries ==
Consider a game with $N$ agents with agent $i$ having strategy $A_i\subseteq\mathbb{R}$; write $\mathbf{a}$ for an N-tuple of actions (i.e. $\mathbf{a}\in\prod_{j=1}^NA_j$) and $\mathbf{a}_{-i}=(a_1,a_2,\ldots,a_{i-1},a_{i+1},\ldots,a_N)$ as the vector of all agents' actions apart from agent $i$.

Let $U_i:A_i\longrightarrow\mathbb{R}$ be the payoff function for agent $i$.

A game is defined as $[(A_i,U_i); i=1,\ldots,N]$.

== Definition ==
Function $U_i:A\longrightarrow\mathbb{R}$ is graph continuous if for all $\mathbf{a}\in A$ there exists a function $F_i:A_{-i}\longrightarrow A_i$ such that $U_i(F_i(\mathbf{a}_{-i}),\mathbf{a}_{-i})$ is continuous at $\mathbf{a}_{-i}$.

Dasgupta and Maskin named this property "graph continuity" because, if one plots a graph of a player's payoff as a function of his own strategy (keeping the other players' strategies fixed), then a graph-continuous payoff function will result in this graph changing continuously as one varies the strategies of the other players.

The property is interesting in view of the following theorem.

If, for $1\leq i\leq N$, $A_i\subseteq\mathbb{R}^m$ is non-empty, convex, and compact; and if $U_i:A\longrightarrow\mathbb{R}$ is quasi-concave in $a_i$, upper semi-continuous in $\mathbf{a}$, and graph continuous, then the game $[(A_i,U_i); i=1,\ldots,N]$ possesses a pure strategy Nash equilibrium.
