= Inverse mapping theorem =

In mathematics, inverse mapping theorem may refer to:

- the inverse function theorem on the existence of local inverses for functions with non-singular derivatives
- the bounded inverse theorem on the boundedness of the inverse for invertible bounded linear operators on Banach spaces
