= Almost open map =

Map that satisfies a condition similar to that of being an open map

In functional analysis and related areas of mathematics, an almost open map between topological spaces is a map that satisfies a condition similar to, but weaker than, the condition of being an open map. As described below, for certain broad categories of topological vector spaces, all surjective linear operators are necessarily almost open.

== Definitions ==
Given a surjective map $f : X \to Y,$ a point $x \in X$ is called a point of openness for $f$ and $f$ is said to be open at $x$ (or an open map at $x$) if for every open neighborhood $U$ of $x,$ $f(U)$ is a neighborhood of $f(x)$ in $Y$ (note that the neighborhood $f(U)$ is not required to be an open neighborhood).

A surjective map is called an open map if it is open at every point of its domain, while it is called an almost open map if each of its fibers has some point of openness. Explicitly, a surjective map $f : X \to Y$ is said to be almost open if for every $y \in Y,$ there exists some $x \in f^{-1}(y)$ such that $f$ is open at $x.$ Every almost open surjection is necessarily a pseudo-open map (introduced by Alexander Arhangelskii in 1963), which by definition means that for every $y \in Y$ and every neighborhood $U$ of $f^{-1}(y)$ (that is, $f^{-1}(y) \subseteq \operatorname{Int}_X U$), $f(U)$ is necessarily a neighborhood of $y.$

=== Almost open linear map ===
A linear map $T : X \to Y$ between two topological vector spaces (TVSs) is called a nearly open linear map or an almost open linear map if for any neighborhood $U$ of $0$ in $X,$ the closure of $T(U)$ in $Y$ is a neighborhood of the origin. Importantly, some authors use a different definition of "almost open map" in which they instead require that the linear map $T$ satisfy: for any neighborhood $U$ of $0$ in $X,$ the closure of $T(U)$ in $T(X)$ (rather than in $Y$) is a neighborhood of the origin; this article will not use this definition.

If a linear map $T : X \to Y$ is almost open then because $T(X)$ is a vector subspace of $Y$ that contains a neighborhood of the origin in $Y,$ the map $T : X \to Y$ is necessarily surjective. For this reason many authors require surjectivity as part of the definition of "almost open".

If $T : X \to Y$ is a bijective linear operator, then $T$ is almost open if and only if $T^{-1}$ is almost continuous.

== Relationship to open maps ==
Every surjective open map is an almost open map but in general, the converse is not necessarily true. If a surjection $f : (X, \tau) \to (Y, \sigma)$ is an almost open map then it will be an open map if it satisfies the following condition (a condition that does not depend in any way on $Y$'s topology $\sigma$):

whenever $m, n \in X$ belong to the same fiber of $f$ (that is, $f(m) = f(n)$) then for every neighborhood $U \in \tau$ of $m,$ there exists some neighborhood $V \in \tau$ of $n$ such that $F(V) \subseteq F(U).$

If the map is continuous then the above condition is also necessary for the map to be open. That is, if $f : X \to Y$ is a continuous surjection then it is an open map if and only if it is almost open and it satisfies the above condition.

=== Open mapping theorems ===
Theorem: If $T : X \to Y$ is a surjective linear operator from a locally convex space $X$ onto a barrelled space $Y$ then $T$ is almost open.

Theorem: If $T : X \to Y$ is a surjective linear operator from a TVS $X$ onto a Baire space $Y$ then $T$ is almost open.

The two theorems above do not require the surjective linear map to satisfy any topological conditions.

Theorem: If $X$ is a complete pseudometrizable TVS, $Y$ is a Hausdorff TVS, and $T : X \to Y$ is a closed and almost open linear surjection, then $T$ is an open map.

Theorem: Suppose $T : X \to Y$ is a continuous linear operator from a complete pseudometrizable TVS $X$ into a Hausdorff TVS $Y.$ If the image of $T$ is non-meager in $Y$ then $T : X \to Y$ is a surjective open map and $Y$ is a complete metrizable space.

== See also ==
- Almost open set – Difference of an open set by a meager set
- Barrelled space – Type of topological vector space
- Bounded inverse theorem – Condition for a linear operator to be open
- Closed graph – Property of functions in topology
- Closed graph theorem – Theorem relating continuity to graphs
- Open set – Basic subset of a topological space
- Open and closed maps – A function that sends open (resp. closed) subsets to open (resp. closed) subsets
- Open mapping theorem (functional analysis) – Condition for a linear operator to be open (also known as the Banach–Schauder theorem)
- Quasi-open map – Function that maps non-empty open sets to sets that have non-empty interior in its codomain
- Surjection of Fréchet spaces – Characterization of surjectivity
- Webbed space – Space where open mapping and closed graph theorems hold

== Bibliography ==
- Bourbaki, Nicolas (1987) [1981]. Topological Vector Spaces: Chapters 1–5. Éléments de mathématique. Translated by Eggleston, H.G.; Madan, S. Berlin New York: Springer-Verlag. ISBN 3-540-13627-4. OCLC 17499190.
- Husain, Taqdir; Khaleelulla, S. M. (1978). Barrelledness in Topological and Ordered Vector Spaces. Lecture Notes in Mathematics. Vol. 692. Berlin, New York, Heidelberg: Springer-Verlag. ISBN 978-3-540-09096-0. OCLC 4493665.
- Jarchow, Hans (1981). Locally convex spaces. Stuttgart: B.G. Teubner. ISBN 978-3-519-02224-4. OCLC 8210342.
- Khaleelulla, S. M. (1982). Counterexamples in Topological Vector Spaces. Lecture Notes in Mathematics. Vol. 936. Berlin, Heidelberg, New York: Springer-Verlag. ISBN 978-3-540-11565-6. OCLC 8588370.
- Köthe, Gottfried (1983) [1969]. Topological Vector Spaces I. Grundlehren der mathematischen Wissenschaften. Vol. 159. Translated by Garling, D.J.H. New York: Springer Science & Business Media. ISBN 978-3-642-64988-2. MR 0248498. OCLC 840293704.
- Narici, Lawrence; Beckenstein, Edward (2011). Topological Vector Spaces. Pure and applied mathematics (Second ed.). Boca Raton, FL: CRC Press. ISBN 978-1584888666. OCLC 144216834.
- Robertson, Alex P.; Robertson, Wendy J. (1980). Topological Vector Spaces. Cambridge Tracts in Mathematics. Vol. 53. Cambridge England: Cambridge University Press. ISBN 978-0-521-29882-7. OCLC 589250.
- Schaefer, Helmut H.; Wolff, Manfred P. (1999). Topological Vector Spaces. GTM. Vol. 8 (Second ed.). New York, NY: Springer New York Imprint Springer. ISBN 978-1-4612-7155-0. OCLC 840278135.
- Trèves, François (2006) [1967]. Topological Vector Spaces, Distributions and Kernels. Mineola, N.Y.: Dover Publications. ISBN 978-0-486-45352-1. OCLC 853623322.
- Wilansky, Albert (2013). Modern Methods in Topological Vector Spaces. Mineola, New York: Dover Publications, Inc. ISBN 978-0-486-49353-4. OCLC 849801114.
