= Quasinorm =

Type of function in linear algebra

In linear algebra, functional analysis and related areas of mathematics, a quasinorm is similar to a norm in that it satisfies the norm axioms, except that the triangle inequality is replaced by
$$\|x + y\| \leq K(\|x\| + \|y\|)$$
for some $K > 1.$

== Definition ==
A quasi-seminorm on a vector space $X$ is a real-valued map $p$ on $X$ that satisfies the following conditions:

1. Non-negativity: $p \geq 0;$
2. Absolute homogeneity: $p(s x) = |s| p(x)$ for all $x \in X$ and all scalars $s;$
3. there exists a real $k \geq 1$ such that $p(x + y) \leq k [p(x) + p(y)]$ for all $x, y \in X.$
  - If $k = 1$ then this inequality reduces to the triangle inequality. It is in this sense that this condition generalizes the usual triangle inequality.

A quasinorm is a quasi-seminorm that also satisfies:

4. Positive definite/Point-separating: if $x \in X$ satisfies $p(x) = 0,$ then $x = 0.$

A pair $(X, p)$ consisting of a vector space $X$ and an associated quasi-seminorm $p$ is called a quasi-seminormed vector space. If the quasi-seminorm is a quasinorm then it is also called a quasinormed vector space.

Multiplier

The infimum of all values of $k$ that satisfy condition (3) is called the multiplier of $p.$ The multiplier itself will also satisfy condition (3) and so it is the unique smallest real number that satisfies this condition. The term $k$-quasi-seminorm is sometimes used to describe a quasi-seminorm whose multiplier is equal to $k.$

A norm (respectively, a seminorm) is just a quasinorm (respectively, a quasi-seminorm) whose multiplier is $1.$ Thus every seminorm is a quasi-seminorm and every norm is a quasinorm (and a quasi-seminorm).

=== Topology ===
If $p$ is a quasinorm on $X$ then $p$ induces a vector topology on $X$ whose neighborhood basis at the origin is given by the sets:
$$\{x \in X : p(x) < 1/n\}$$
as $n$ ranges over the positive integers. A topological vector space with such a topology is called a quasinormed topological vector space or just a quasinormed space.

Every quasinormed topological vector space is pseudometrizable.

A complete quasinormed space is called a quasi-Banach space. Every Banach space is a quasi-Banach space, although not conversely.

=== Related definitions ===
A quasinormed space $(A, \| \,\cdot\, \|)$ is called a quasinormed algebra if the vector space $A$ is an algebra and there is a constant $K > 0$ such that
$$\|x y\| \leq K \|x\| \cdot \|y\|$$
for all $x, y \in A.$

A complete quasinormed algebra is called a quasi-Banach algebra.

== Characterizations ==
A topological vector space (TVS) is a quasinormed space if and only if it has a bounded neighborhood of the origin.

== Examples ==
Since every norm is a quasinorm, every normed space is also a quasinormed space.

$L^p$ spaces with $0 < p < 1$

The $L^p$ spaces for $0 < p < 1$ are quasinormed spaces (indeed, they are even F-spaces) but they are not, in general, normable (meaning that there might not exist any norm that defines their topology). For $0 < p < 1,$ the Lebesgue space $L^p([0, 1])$ is a complete metrizable TVS (an F-space) that is not locally convex (in fact, its only convex open subsets are itself $L^p([0, 1])$ and the empty set) and the only continuous linear functional on $L^p([0, 1])$ is the constant $0$ function (Rudin 1991, §1.47). In particular, the Hahn-Banach theorem does not hold for $L^p([0, 1])$ when $0 < p < 1.$

== See also ==
- Metrizable topological vector space – Topological vector space whose topology can be defined by a metric
- Norm (mathematics) – Length in a vector space
- Seminorm – Mathematical function
- Topological vector space – Vector space with a notion of nearness
