= Closed graph property =

Property of functions in topology

A discontinuous function with a closed graph: there are no "missing" (limit) points

Discontinuous function with a graph that is not closed: the point $(0,0)$ is a limit point that is not a point on the graph.

In mathematics, particularly in functional analysis and topology, closed graph is a property of functions. A real function $y=f(x)$ is closed if the graph is closed, meaning that it contains all of its limit points. Every such continuous function has a closed graph, but the converse is not necessarily true.

More generally, a function f : X → Y between topological spaces has a closed graph if its graph is a closed subset of the product space X × Y.

This property is studied because there are many theorems, known as closed graph theorems, giving conditions under which a function with a closed graph is necessarily continuous. One particularly well-known class of closed graph theorems are the closed graph theorems in functional analysis.

== Definitions ==
=== Graphs and set-valued functions ===
Definition and notation: The graph of a function f : X → Y is the set

Gr f := { (x, f(x)) : x ∈ X} = { (x, y) ∈ X × Y : y = f(x)}.

Notation: If Y is a set then the power set of Y, which is the set of all subsets of Y, is denoted by 2^{Y} or 𝒫(Y).

Definition: If X and Y are sets, a set-valued function in Y on X (also called a Y-valued multifunction on X) is a function F : X → 2^{Y} with domain X that is valued in 2^{Y}. That is, F is a function on X such that for every x ∈ X, F(x) is a subset of Y.
- Some authors call a function F : X → 2^{Y} a set-valued function only if it satisfies the additional requirement that F(x) is not empty for every x ∈ X; this article does not require this.

Definition and notation: If F : X → 2^{Y} is a set-valued function in a set Y then the graph of F is the set

Gr F := { (x, y) ∈ X × Y : y ∈ F(x)}.

Definition: A function f : X → Y can be canonically identified with the set-valued function F : X → 2^{Y} defined by F(x) := { f(x)} for every x ∈ X, where F is called the canonical set-valued function induced by (or associated with) f.
- Note that in this case, Gr f = Gr F.

=== Closed graph ===
We give the more general definition of when a Y-valued function or set-valued function defined on a subset S of X has a closed graph since this generality is needed in the study of closed linear operators that are defined on a dense subspace S of a topological vector space X (and not necessarily defined on all of X). This particular case is one of the main reasons why functions with closed graphs are studied in functional analysis.

Assumptions: Throughout, X and Y are topological spaces, S ⊆ X, and f is a Y-valued function or set-valued function on S (i.e. f : S → Y or f : S → 2^{Y}). X × Y will always be endowed with the product topology.

Definition: We say that f has a closed graph in X × Y if the graph of f, Gr f, is a closed subset of X × Y when X × Y is endowed with the product topology. If S = X or if X is clear from context then we may omit writing "in X × Y"

Observation: If g : S → Y is a function and G is the canonical set-valued function induced by g (i.e. G : S → 2^{Y} is defined by G(s) := { g(s)} for every s ∈ S) then since Gr g = Gr G, g has a closed (resp. sequentially closed) graph in X × Y if and only if the same is true of G.

=== Closable maps and closures ===
Definition: We say that the function (resp. set-valued function) f is closable in X × Y if there exists a subset D ⊆ X containing S and a function (resp. set-valued function) F : D → Y whose graph is equal to the closure of the set Gr f in X × Y. Such an F is called a closure of f in X × Y, is denoted by f̅, and necessarily extends f.
- Additional assumptions for linear maps: If in addition, S, X, and Y are topological vector spaces and f : S → Y is a linear map then to call f closable we also require that the set D be a vector subspace of X and the closure of f be a linear map.

Definition: If f is closable on S then a core or essential domain of f is a subset D ⊆ S such that the closure in X × Y of the graph of the restriction f |_{D} : D → Y of f to D is equal to the closure of the graph of f in X × Y (i.e. the closure of Gr f in X × Y is equal to the closure of Gr f |_{D} in X × Y).

=== Closed maps and closed linear operators ===
Definition and notation: When we write f : D(f) ⊆ X → Y then we mean that f is a Y-valued function with domain D(f) where D(f) ⊆ X. If we say that f : D(f) ⊆ X → Y is closed (resp. sequentially closed) or has a closed graph (resp. has a sequentially closed graph) then we mean that the graph of f is closed (resp. sequentially closed) in X × Y (rather than in D(f) × Y).

When reading literature in functional analysis, if f : X → Y is a linear map between topological vector spaces (TVSs) (e.g. Banach spaces) then "f is closed" will almost always means the following:

Definition: A map f : X → Y is called closed if its graph is closed in X × Y. In particular, the term "closed linear operator" will almost certainly refer to a linear map whose graph is closed.

Otherwise, especially in literature about point-set topology, "f is closed" may instead mean the following:

Definition: A map f : X → Y between topological spaces is called a closed map if the image of a closed subset of X is a closed subset of Y.

These two definitions of "closed map" are not equivalent. If it is unclear, then it is recommended that a reader check how "closed map" is defined by the literature they are reading.

== Characterizations ==
Throughout, let X and Y be topological spaces.

Function with a closed graph

If f : X → Y is a function then the following are equivalent:

1. f has a closed graph (in X × Y);
2. (definition) the graph of f, Gr f, is a closed subset of X × Y;
3. for every x ∈ X and net x_{•} = (x_{i})_{i ∈ I} in X such that x_{•} → x in X, if y ∈ Y is such that the net f(x_{•}) := (f(x_{i}))_{i ∈ I} → y in Y then y = f(x);
  - Compare this to the definition of continuity in terms of nets, which recall is the following: for every x ∈ X and net x_{•} = (x_{i})_{i ∈ I} in X such that x_{•} → x in X, f(x_{•}) → f(x) in Y.
  - Thus to show that the function f has a closed graph we may assume that f(x_{•}) converges in Y to some y ∈ Y (and then show that y = f(x)) while to show that f is continuous we may not assume that f(x_{•}) converges in Y to some y ∈ Y and we must instead prove that this is true (and moreover, we must more specifically prove that f(x_{•}) converges to f(x) in Y).

and if Y is a Hausdorff space that is compact, then we may add to this list:

f is continuous;

and if both X and Y are first-countable spaces then we may add to this list:

f has a sequentially closed graph (in X × Y);

Function with a sequentially closed graph

If f : X → Y is a function then the following are equivalent:

1. f has a sequentially closed graph (in X × Y);
2. (definition) the graph of f is a sequentially closed subset of X × Y;
3. for every x ∈ X and sequence x_{•} = (x_{i})^{∞}_{i=1} in X such that x_{•} → x in X, if y ∈ Y is such that the net f(x_{•}) := (f(x_{i}))^{∞}_{i=1} → y in Y then y = f(x);

set-valued function with a closed graph

If F : X → 2^{Y} is a set-valued function between topological spaces X and Y then the following are equivalent:

1. F has a closed graph (in X × Y);
2. (definition) the graph of F is a closed subset of X × Y;

and if Y is compact and Hausdorff then we may add to this list:

F is upper hemicontinuous and F(x) is a closed subset of Y for all x ∈ X;

and if both X and Y are metrizable spaces then we may add to this list:

for all x ∈ X, y ∈ Y, and sequences x_{•} = (x_{i})^{∞}_{i=1} in X and y_{•} = (y_{i})^{∞}_{i=1} in Y such that x_{•} → x in X and y_{•} → y in Y, and y_{i} ∈ F(x_{i}) for all i, then y ∈ F(x).

=== Characterizations of closed graphs (general topology) ===
Throughout, let $X$ and $Y$ be topological spaces and $X \times Y$ is endowed with the product topology.

==== Function with a closed graph ====
If $f : X \to Y$ is a function then it is said to have a closed graph if it satisfies any of the following are equivalent conditions:

1. (Definition): The graph $\operatorname{graph} f$ of $f$ is a closed subset of $X \times Y.$
2. For every $x \in X$ and net $x_{\bull} = \left(x_i\right)_{i \in I}$ in $X$ such that $x_{\bull} \to x$ in $X,$ if $y \in Y$ is such that the net $f\left(x_{\bull}\right) = \left(f\left(x_i\right)\right)_{i \in I} \to y$ in $Y$ then $y = f(x).$
  - Compare this to the definition of continuity in terms of nets, which recall is the following: for every $x \in X$ and net $x_{\bull} = \left(x_i\right)_{i \in I}$ in $X$ such that $x_{\bull} \to x$ in $X,$ $f\left(x_{\bull}\right) \to f(x)$ in $Y.$
  - Thus to show that the function $f$ has a closed graph, it may be assumed that $f\left(x_{\bull}\right)$ converges in $Y$ to some $y \in Y$ (and then show that $y = f(x)$) while to show that $f$ is continuous, it may not be assumed that $f\left(x_{\bull}\right)$ converges in $Y$ to some $y \in Y$ and instead, it must be proven that this is true (and moreover, it must more specifically be proven that $f\left(x_{\bull}\right)$ converges to $f(x)$ in $Y$).

and if $Y$ is a Hausdorff compact space then we may add to this list:

3. $f$ is continuous.

and if both $X$ and $Y$ are first-countable spaces then we may add to this list:

4. $f$ has a sequentially closed graph in $X \times Y.$

Function with a sequentially closed graph

If $f : X \to Y$ is a function then the following are equivalent:

1. $f$ has a sequentially closed graph in $X \times Y.$
2. Definition: the graph of $f$ is a sequentially closed subset of $X \times Y.$
3. For every $x \in X$ and sequence $x_{\bull} = \left(x_i\right)_{i=1}^{\infty}$ in $X$ such that $x_{\bull} \to x$ in $X,$ if $y \in Y$ is such that the net $f\left(x_{\bull}\right) := \left(f\left(x_i\right)\right)_{i=1}^{\infty} \to y$ in $Y$ then $y = f(x).$

== Sufficient conditions for a closed graph ==
- If f : X → Y is a continuous function between topological spaces and if Y is Hausdorff then f has a closed graph in X × Y. However, if f is a function between Hausdorff topological spaces, then it is possible for f to have a closed graph in X × Y but not be continuous.

== Closed graph theorems ==
Conditions that guarantee that a function with a closed graph is necessarily continuous are called closed graph theorems. Closed graph theorems are of particular interest in functional analysis where there are many theorems giving conditions under which a linear map with a closed graph is necessarily continuous.

- If f : X → Y is a function between topological spaces whose graph is closed in X × Y and if Y is a compact space then f : X → Y is continuous.

== Examples ==
=== Continuous but not closed maps ===
- Let X denote the real numbers ℝ with the usual Euclidean topology and let Y denote ℝ with the indiscrete topology (where note that Y is not Hausdorff and that every function valued in Y is continuous). Let f : X → Y be defined by f(0) = 1 and f(x) = 0 for all x ≠ 0. Then f : X → Y is continuous but its graph is not closed in X × Y.
- If X is any space then the identity map Id : X → X is continuous but its graph, which is the diagonal Gr Id := { (x, x) : x ∈ X}, is closed in X × X if and only if X is Hausdorff. In particular, if X is not Hausdorff then Id : X → X is continuous but not closed.
- If f : X → Y is a continuous map whose graph is not closed then Y is not a Hausdorff space.

=== Closed but not continuous maps ===
- Let X and Y both denote the real numbers ℝ with the usual Euclidean topology. Let f : X → Y be defined by f(0) = 0 and f(x) = 1/x for all x ≠ 0. Then f : X → Y has a closed graph (and a sequentially closed graph) in X × Y = ℝ^{2} but it is not continuous (since it has a discontinuity at x = 0).
- Let X denote the real numbers ℝ with the usual Euclidean topology, let Y denote ℝ with the discrete topology, and let Id : X → Y be the identity map (i.e. Id(x) := x for every x ∈ X). Then Id : X → Y is a linear map whose graph is closed in X × Y but it is clearly not continuous (since singleton sets are open in Y but not in X).
- Let (X, 𝜏) be a Hausdorff TVS and let 𝜐 be a vector topology on X that is strictly finer than 𝜏. Then the identity map Id : (X, 𝜏) → (X, 𝜐) is a closed discontinuous linear operator.

== See also ==
- Almost open linear map – Map that satisfies a condition similar to that of being an open map
- Closed graph theorem – Theorem relating continuity to graphs
- Closed graph theorem (functional analysis) – Theorems connecting continuity to closure of graphs
- Kakutani fixed-point theorem – Fixed-point theorem for set-valued functions
- Open mapping theorem (functional analysis) – Condition for a linear operator to be open
- Webbed space – Space where open mapping and closed graph theorems hold
- Graph continuous function
