= Open mapping theorem (functional analysis) =

Condition for a linear operator to be open

In functional analysis, the open mapping theorem, also known as the Banach–Schauder theorem or the Banach theorem (named after Stefan Banach and Juliusz Schauder), is a fundamental result that states that if a bounded or continuous linear operator between Banach spaces is surjective then it is an open map.

A special case is also called the bounded inverse theorem (also called inverse mapping theorem or Banach isomorphism theorem), which states that a bijective bounded linear operator $T$ from one Banach space to another has bounded inverse $T^{-1}$.

== Statement and proof ==
Open mapping theorem— Let $T: E \to F$ be a surjective continuous linear map between Banach spaces (or more generally Fréchet spaces). Then $T$ is an open mapping (that is, if $U \subset E$ is an open subset, then $T(U)$ is open).

The proof here uses the Baire category theorem, and completeness of both $E$ and $F$ is essential to the theorem. The statement of the theorem is no longer true if either space is assumed to be only a normed vector space; see § Counterexample.

The proof is based on the following lemmas, which are also somewhat of independent interest. A linear map $f : E \to F$ between topological vector spaces is said to be nearly open if, for each neighborhood $U$ of zero, the closure $\overline{f(U)}$ contains a neighborhood of zero. The next lemma may be thought of as a weak version of the open mapping theorem.

Lemma— A linear map $f : E \to F$ between normed spaces is nearly open if the image of $f$ is non-meager in $F$. (The continuity is not needed.)

Proof: Shrinking $U$, we can assume $U$ is an open ball centered at zero. We have $f(E) = f\left(\bigcup_{n \in \N} n U\right) = \bigcup_{n \in \N} f(nU)$. Thus, some $\overline{f(nU)}$ contains an interior point $y$; that is, for some radius $r > 0$,

$$B_F(y, r) \subset \overline{f(nU)}.$$

Then for any $v$ in $F$ with $\|v\| < r$, by linearity, convexity and $(-1)U \subset U$,

$$v = v - y + y \in \overline{f(-nU)} + \overline{f(nU)} \subset \overline{f(2nU)}$$,

which proves the lemma by dividing by $2n$.$\square$ (The same proof works if $E, F$ are pre-Fréchet spaces.)

The completeness on the domain then allows to upgrade nearly open to open.

Lemma (Schauder)— Let $f: E \to F$ be a continuous linear map between normed spaces.

If $f$ is nearly-open and if $E$ is complete, then $f$ is open.

More precisely, if $B_F(0, \delta) \subset \overline{f(B_E(0, 1))}$ for some $\delta > 0$ and if $E$ is complete, then

$$B_F(0, \delta) \subset f(B_E(0, 1))$$

where $B_Z(x, r)$ is an open ball in space $Z$ with radius $r$ and center $x$.

Proof: Let $y$ be in $B_F(0, \delta)$ and $c_n > 0$ some sequence with $\sum c_n < \infty$ (and therefore $\lim\limits_{n\to\infty}c_n = 0$). We have: $\overline{B_F(0, \delta)} \subset \overline{f(B_E(0,1))}$. Thus, for each $z$ in $F$ we have $z\in\overline{B_F(0, \|z\|_F)} \subset \overline{f(B_E(0,\delta^{-1}\|z\|_F))}$, so for each $\epsilon > 0$ we can find an $x$ in $E$ with $\|x\|_E < \delta^{-1}\|z\|_F$ and $\|z - f(x)\|_F < \epsilon$. Thus, taking $z = y$, we find an $x_1$ such that

$$\|y - f(x_1)\|_F < c_1, \, \|x_1\|_E < \delta^{-1} \|y\|_F.$$

Applying the same argument with $z = y - f(x_1)$, we then find an $x_2$ such that

$$\|y - f(x_1) - f(x_2)\|_F < c_2, \, \|x_2\|_E < \delta^{-1}c_1$$

where we observed $\|x_2\|_E < \delta^{-1} \|z\|_F < \delta^{-1} c_1$. Then so on with $\|x_{n + 1}\|_E < \delta^{-1} c_n$. Thus, we found a sequence $x_n$ such that $x = \sum_1^{\infty} x_n$ converges (the partial sums are a Cauchy sequence, as their difference $\left\|\sum_{i + 1}^j x_n\right\|_E \le \sum_{i + 1}^j \|x_n\|_E < \delta^{-1} \sum_i^{j - 1} c_n < \delta^{-1} \sum_i^\infty c_n$ can be made arbitrarily small, depending only on $i$) and $\|y - f(x)\|_F = 0$, i.e. $f(x) = y$. Also, if $c := \sum c_n < \infty$,

$$\|x\|_E \le \sum_1^{\infty} \|x_n\|_E \le \delta^{-1} \|y\|_F + \delta^{-1} c.$$

Since $\delta^{-1} \|y\|_F < 1$, by making $c$ small enough, we can achieve $\|x\|_E < 1$. $\square$ (Again the same proof is valid if $E, F$ are pre-Fréchet spaces.)

Proof of the theorem: By Baire's category theorem, the first lemma applies. Then the conclusion of the theorem follows from the second lemma. $\square$

In general, a continuous bijection between topological spaces is not necessarily a homeomorphism. The open mapping theorem, when it applies, implies the bijectivity is enough:

Corollary (Bounded inverse theorem)— A continuous bijective linear operator between Banach spaces (or Fréchet spaces) has a continuous inverse. That is, the inverse operator is continuous.

Even though the above bounded inverse theorem is a special case of the open mapping theorem, the open mapping theorem in turn follows from that. Indeed, a surjective continuous linear operator $T : E \to F$ factors as

$$T : E \overset{p}\to E/\operatorname{ker} T \overset{T_0}\to F.$$

Here, $T_0$ is continuous and bijective and thus is a homeomorphism by the bounded inverse theorem; in particular, it is an open mapping. As a quotient map for topological groups is open, $T$ is open then.

Because the open mapping theorem and the bounded inverse theorem are essentially the same result, they are often simply called Banach's theorem.

=== Transpose formulation ===
Here is a formulation of the open mapping theorem in terms of the transpose of an operator.

Theorem— Let $X$ and $Y$ be Banach spaces, let $B_X$ and $B_Y$ denote their open unit balls, and let $T : X \to Y$ be a bounded linear operator. If $\delta > 0$ then among the following four statements we have $(1) \implies (2) \implies (3) \implies (4)$ (with the same $\delta$)

1. $\delta \left\|y'\right\| \le \left\|T' y'\right\|$ for all $y' \in Y'$ = continuous dual of $Y$;
2. $\delta B_Y \subset \overline{T\left(B_X\right)}$;
3. $\delta B_Y \subset {T\left(B_X\right)}$;
4. $T$ is surjective.

Furthermore, if $T$ is surjective then (1) holds for some $\delta > 0.$

Proof: The idea of 1. $\Rightarrow$ 2. is to show: $y \notin \overline{T(B_X)} \Rightarrow \|y\| > \delta,$ and that follows from the Hahn–Banach theorem. 2. $\Rightarrow$ 3. is exactly the second lemma in § Statement and proof. Finally, 3. $\Rightarrow$ 4. is trivial and 4. $\Rightarrow$ 1. easily follows from the open mapping theorem. $\square$

Alternatively, 1. implies that $T'$ is injective and has closed image and then by the closed range theorem, that implies $T$ has dense image and closed image, respectively; i.e., $T$ is surjective. Hence, the above result is a variant of a special case of the closed range theorem.

=== Quantitative formulation ===
Terence Tao gives the following quantitative formulation of the theorem:

Theorem—Let $T: E \to F$ be a bounded operator between Banach spaces. Then the following are equivalent:

1. $T$ is open.
2. $T$ is surjective.
3. There exists a constant $C > 0$ such that, for each $f$ in $F$, the equation $Tu = f$ has a solution $u$ with $\|u\| \le C \|f\|$.
4. 3. holds for $f$ in some dense subspace of $F$.

The proof follows a cycle of implications $1\Rightarrow 4\Rightarrow 3\Rightarrow 2\Rightarrow 1$. Here $2 \Rightarrow 1$ is the usual open mapping theorem.

$1 \Rightarrow 4$: For some $r > 0$, we have $B(0, 2) \subset T(B(0, r))$ where $B$ means an open ball. Then $\frac{f}{\|f\|} = T \left(\frac{u}{\|f\|} \right)$ for some $\frac{u}{\|f\|}$ in $B(0, r)$. That is, $Tu = f$ with $\|u\| < r\|f\|$.

$4 \Rightarrow 3$: We can write $f = \sum_0^{\infty} f_j$ with $f_j$ in the dense subspace and the sum converging in norm. Then, since $E$ is complete, $u = \sum_0^{\infty} u_j$ with $\|u_j\| \le C \|f_j\|$ and $Tu_j = f_j$ is a required solution.

Finally, $3 \Rightarrow 2$ is trivial. $\square$

== Counterexample ==
The open mapping theorem may not hold for normed spaces that are not complete. A quickest way to see this is to note that the closed graph theorem, a consequence of the open mapping theorem, fails without completeness. But here is a more concrete counterexample. Consider the space $X$ of sequences $x:\mathbb{N}\rightarrow\mathbb{R}$ with only finitely many non-zero terms equipped with the supremum norm. The map $T:X\rightarrow X$ defined by

$$T x = \left( x_{1}, \frac{x_{2}}{2}, \frac{x_{3}}{3}, \dots \right)$$

is bounded, linear and invertible, but $T^{-1}$ is unbounded. This does not contradict the bounded inverse theorem since $X$ is not complete, and thus is not a Banach space. To see that it's not complete, consider the sequence of sequences $x^{(n)}\in X$ given by

$$x^{(n)} = \left( 1, \frac1{2}, \dots, \frac1{n}, 0, 0, \dots \right)$$

converges as $n\rightarrow\infty$ to the sequence $x^{(\infty)}$ given by

$$x^{(\infty)} = \left( 1, \frac1{2}, \dots, \frac1{n}, \dots \right),$$

which has all its terms non-zero, and so does not lie in $X$.

The completion of $X$ is the space $c_0$ of all sequences that converge to zero, which is a (closed) subspace of the ℓ^{p} space $\ell^{\infty}(\mathbb{N})$, which is the space of all bounded sequences. However, in this case, the map $T$ is not onto, and thus not a bijection. To see this, one need simply note that the sequence

$$x = \left( 1, \frac12, \frac13, \dots \right),$$

is an element of $c_0$, but is not in the range of $T:c_0\to c_0$. The same reasoning applies to show $T$ is also not onto in $\ell^\infty$, for example $x = \left( 1, 1, 1, \dots \right)$ is not in the range of $T$.

Even if the domain is complete (or the codomain is), the Open Mapping Theorem still requires both spaces to be complete. To see this, consider the identity map from the space $Y$ of absolutely summable sequences (that is, those with finite 1-norm) with the 1-norm to the space $Y$ with the supremum norm. Since this map is norm decreasing, it is bounded, but it is not open. To see that the domain must also be complete, let $(Z,\|\cdot\|)$ be a Banach space with a discontinuous linear functional $f$ on it. Then $(Z,\|\cdot\|+|f(\cdot)|)$ is a non-complete normed space, and the identity map from $(Z,\|\cdot\|+|f(\cdot)|)$ to $(Z,\|\cdot\|)$ is a norm-decreasing (therefore bounded) map which is not open.

== Consequences ==
The open mapping theorem has several important consequences:

- If $T : X \to Y$ is a bijective continuous linear operator between the Banach spaces $X$ and $Y,$ then the inverse operator $T^{-1} : Y \to X$ is continuous as well (this is called the bounded inverse theorem).
- If $T : X \to Y$ is a linear operator between the Banach spaces $X$ and $Y,$ and if for every sequence $\left(x_n\right)$ in $X$ with $x_n \to 0$ and $T x_n \to y$ it follows that $y = 0,$ then $T$ is continuous (the closed graph theorem).
- Given a bounded operator $T : E \to F$ between normed spaces, if the image of $T$ is non-meager and if $E$ is complete, then $T$ is open and surjective and $F$ is complete (to see this, use the two lemmas in the proof of the theorem).
- An exact sequence of Banach spaces (or more generally Fréchet spaces) is topologically exact.
- The closed range theorem, which says an operator (under some assumption) has closed image if and only if its transpose has closed image (see closed range theorem#Sketch of proof).

The open mapping theorem does not imply that a continuous surjective linear operator admits a continuous linear section. What we have is:

- A surjective continuous linear operator between Banach spaces admits a continuous linear section if and only if the kernel is topologically complemented.

In particular, the above applies to an operator between Hilbert spaces or an operator with finite-dimensional kernel (by the Hahn–Banach theorem). If one drops the requirement that a section be linear, a surjective continuous linear operator between Banach spaces admits a continuous section; this is the Bartle–Graves theorem.

== Generalizations ==
Local convexity of $X$ or $Y$ is not essential to the proof, but completeness is: the theorem remains true in the case when $X$ and $Y$ are F-spaces. Furthermore, the theorem can be combined with the Baire category theorem in the following manner:

Open mapping theorem for continuous maps—Let $A : X \to Y$ be a continuous linear operator from a complete pseudometrizable TVS $X$ onto a Hausdorff TVS $Y.$ If $\operatorname{Im} A$ is nonmeager in $Y$ then $A : X \to Y$ is a (surjective) open map and $Y$ is a complete pseudometrizable TVS. Moreover, if $X$ is assumed to be hausdorff (i.e. a F-space), then $Y$ is also an F-space.

(The proof is essentially the same as the Banach or Fréchet cases; we modify the proof slightly to avoid the use of convexity,)

Furthermore, in this latter case if $N$ is the kernel of $A,$ then there is a canonical factorization of $A$ in the form
$$X \to X/N \overset{\alpha}{\to} Y$$
where $X / N$ is the quotient space (also an F-space) of $X$ by the closed subspace $N.$ The quotient mapping $X \to X / N$ is open, and the mapping $\alpha$ is an isomorphism of topological vector spaces.

An important special case of this theorem can also be stated as

Theorem—Let $X$ and $Y$ be two F-spaces. Then every continuous linear map of $X$ onto $Y$ is a TVS homomorphism, where a linear map $u : X \to Y$ is a topological vector space (TVS) homomorphism if the induced map $\hat{u} : X / \ker(u) \to Y$ is a TVS-isomorphism onto its image.

On the other hand, a more general formulation, which implies the first, can be given:

Open mapping theorem—Let $A : X \to Y$ be a surjective linear map from a complete pseudometrizable TVS $X$ onto a TVS $Y$ and suppose that at least one of the following two conditions is satisfied:

1. $Y$ is a Baire space, or
2. $X$ is locally convex and $Y$ is a barrelled space,

If $A$ is a closed linear operator then $A$ is an open mapping. If $A$ is a continuous linear operator and $Y$ is Hausdorff then $A$ is (a closed linear operator and thus also) an open mapping.

Nearly/Almost open linear maps

A linear map $A : X \to Y$ between two topological vector spaces (TVSs) is called a nearly open map (or sometimes, an almost open map) if for every neighborhood $U$ of the origin in the domain, the closure of its image $\operatorname{cl} A(U)$ is a neighborhood of the origin in $Y.$ Many authors use a different definition of "nearly/almost open map" that requires that the closure of $A(U)$ be a neighborhood of the origin in $A(X)$ rather than in $Y,$ but for surjective maps these definitions are equivalent. A bijective linear map is nearly open if and only if its inverse is continuous. Every surjective linear map from locally convex TVS onto a barrelled TVS is nearly open. The same is true of every surjective linear map from a TVS onto a Baire TVS.

Open mapping theorem—If a closed surjective linear map from a complete pseudometrizable TVS onto a Hausdorff TVS is nearly open then it is open.

Theorem—If $A : X \to Y$ is a continuous linear bijection from a complete Pseudometrizable topological vector space (TVS) onto a Hausdorff TVS that is a Baire space, then $A : X \to Y$ is a homeomorphism (and thus an isomorphism of TVSs).

Webbed spaces are a class of topological vector spaces for which the open mapping theorem and the closed graph theorem hold.

== See also ==
- Closed graph – Property of functions in topology
- Closed graph theorem – Theorem relating continuity to graphs
- Closed graph theorem (functional analysis) – Theorems connecting continuity to closure of graphs
- Open mapping theorem (complex analysis) – Theorem on holomorphic functions
- Surjection of Fréchet spaces – Characterization of surjectivity
- Ursescu theorem – Generalization of closed graph, open mapping, and uniform boundedness theorem
- Webbed space – Space where open mapping and closed graph theorems hold

== Bibliography ==
- Adasch, Norbert; Ernst, Bruno; Keim, Dieter (1978). Topological Vector Spaces: The Theory Without Convexity Conditions. Lecture Notes in Mathematics. Vol. 639. Berlin New York: Springer-Verlag. ISBN 978-3-540-08662-8. OCLC 297140003.
- Banach, Stefan (1932). Théorie des Opérations Linéaires [Theory of Linear Operations] (PDF). Monografie Matematyczne (in French). Vol. 1. Warszawa: Subwencji Funduszu Kultury Narodowej. Zbl 0005.20901. Archived from the original (PDF) on 2014-01-11.
- Berberian, Sterling K. (1974). Lectures in Functional Analysis and Operator Theory. Graduate Texts in Mathematics. Vol. 15. New York: Springer. ISBN 978-0-387-90081-0. OCLC 878109401.
- Bourbaki, Nicolas (1987) [1981]. Topological Vector Spaces: Chapters 1–5. Éléments de mathématique. Translated by Eggleston, H.G.; Madan, S. Berlin New York: Springer-Verlag. ISBN 3-540-13627-4. OCLC 17499190.
- Conway, John B. (1990). A Course in Functional Analysis. Graduate Texts in Mathematics. Vol. 96 (2nd ed.). New York: Springer-Verlag. ISBN 978-0-387-97245-9. OCLC 21195908.
- Dieudonné, Jean (1970). Treatise on Analysis, Volume II. Academic Press.
- Edwards, Robert E. (1995). Functional Analysis: Theory and Applications. New York: Dover Publications. ISBN 978-0-486-68143-6. OCLC 30593138.
- Grothendieck, Alexander (1973). Topological Vector Spaces. Translated by Chaljub, Orlando. New York: Gordon and Breach Science Publishers. ISBN 978-0-677-30020-7. OCLC 886098.
- Jarchow, Hans (1981). Locally convex spaces. Stuttgart: B.G. Teubner. ISBN 978-3-519-02224-4. OCLC 8210342.
- Köthe, Gottfried (1983) [1969]. Topological Vector Spaces I. Grundlehren der mathematischen Wissenschaften. Vol. 159. Translated by Garling, D.J.H. New York: Springer Science & Business Media. ISBN 978-3-642-64988-2. MR 0248498. OCLC 840293704.
- Narici, Lawrence; Beckenstein, Edward (2011). Topological Vector Spaces. Pure and applied mathematics (Second ed.). Boca Raton, FL: CRC Press. ISBN 978-1584888666. OCLC 144216834.
- Robertson, Alex P.; Robertson, Wendy J. (1980). Topological Vector Spaces. Cambridge Tracts in Mathematics. Vol. 53. Cambridge England: Cambridge University Press. ISBN 978-0-521-29882-7. OCLC 589250.
- Rudin, Walter (1973). Functional Analysis. International Series in Pure and Applied Mathematics. Vol. 25 (First ed.). New York, NY: McGraw-Hill Science/Engineering/Math. ISBN 9780070542259.
- Rudin, Walter (1991). Functional Analysis. International Series in Pure and Applied Mathematics. Vol. 8 (Second ed.). New York, NY: McGraw-Hill Science/Engineering/Math. ISBN 978-0-07-054236-5. OCLC 21163277.
- Schaefer, Helmut H.; Wolff, Manfred P. (1999). Topological Vector Spaces. GTM. Vol. 8 (Second ed.). New York, NY: Springer New York Imprint Springer. ISBN 978-1-4612-7155-0. OCLC 840278135.
- Swartz, Charles (1992). An introduction to Functional Analysis. New York: M. Dekker. ISBN 978-0-8247-8643-4. OCLC 24909067.
- Trèves, François (2006) [1967]. Topological Vector Spaces, Distributions and Kernels. Mineola, N.Y.: Dover Publications. ISBN 978-0-486-45352-1. OCLC 853623322.
- Vogt, Dietmar (2000). "Lectures on Fréchet spaces" (PDF). Bergische Universität Wuppertal.
- Wilansky, Albert (2013). Modern Methods in Topological Vector Spaces. Mineola, New York: Dover Publications, Inc. ISBN 978-0-486-49353-4. OCLC 849801114.
