= Open mapping theorem (complex analysis) =

Theorem on holomorphic functions

In complex analysis, the open mapping theorem states that if $U$ is a domain of the complex plane $\mathbb{C}$ and $f: U\to \mathbb{C}$ is a non-constant holomorphic function, then $f$ is an open map (i.e. it sends open subsets of $U$ to open subsets of $\mathbb{C}$, and we have invariance of domain.).

The open mapping theorem points to the sharp difference between holomorphy and real-differentiability. On the real line, for example, the differentiable function $f(x)=x^2$ is not an open map, as the image of the open interval $(-1, 1)$ is the half-open interval $[0, 1)$.

The theorem for example implies that a non-constant holomorphic function cannot map an open disk onto a portion of any line embedded in the complex plane. Images of holomorphic functions can be of real dimension zero (if constant) or two (if non-constant) but never of dimension 1.

== Proof ==
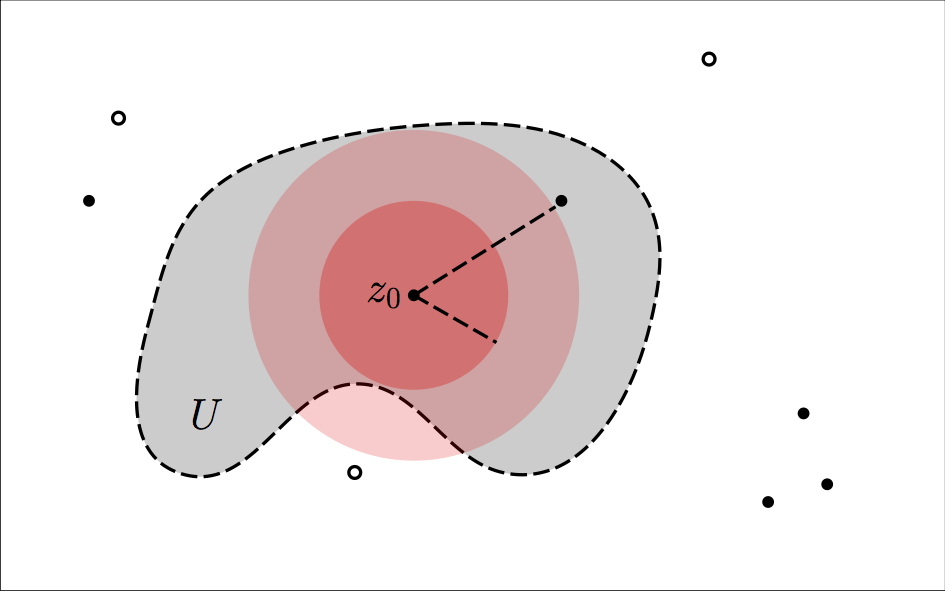
Black dots represent zeros of $g(z)$. Black annuli represent poles. The boundary of the open set $U$ is given by the dashed line. Note that all poles are exterior to the open set. The smaller red disk is $B$, centered at $z_0$.

Assume $f: U\to \mathbb{C}$ is a non-constant holomorphic function and $U$ is a domain of the complex plane. We have to show that every point in $f(U)$ is an interior point of $f(U)$, i.e. that every point in $f(U)$ has a neighborhood (open disk) which is also in $f(U)$.

Consider an arbitrary $w_0$ in $f(U)$. Then there exists a point $z_0$ in $U$ such that $w_0 = f(z_0)$. Since $U$ is open, we can find $d > 0$ such that the closed disk $B$ around $z_0$ with radius $d$ is fully contained in $U$. Consider the function $g(z)=f(z)-w_0$. Note that $z_0$ is a root of the function.

We know that $g(z)$ is non-constant and holomorphic. The roots of $g$ are isolated by the identity theorem, so by further decreasing the radius of the disk $B$, we can ensure that $z_0$ is the only root of $g(z)$ in $B$ (although this single root may have multiplicity greater than 1).

The boundary of $B$ is a circle and hence a compact set, on which $|g(z)|$ is a positive continuous function, so the extreme value theorem guarantees the existence of a positive minimum $e$, that is, $e$ is the minimum of $|g(z)|$ for $z$ on the boundary of $B$ and $e>0$.

Denote by $D$ the open disk around $w_0$ with radius $e$. By Rouché's theorem, the function $g(z)=f(z)-w_0$ will have the same number of roots (counted with multiplicity) in $B$ as $h(z) := f(z)-w_1$ for any $w_1$ in $D$. This is because $h(z) = g(z) + (w_0-w_1)$, and for $z$ on the boundary of $B$, $|g(z)| \geq e > |w_0-w_1|$. Thus, for every $w_1$ in $D$, there exists at least one $z_1$ in $B$ such that $f(z_1) = w_1$. This means that the disk $D$ is contained in $f(B)$.

The image of the ball $B$, $f(B)$ is a subset of the image of $U$, $f(U)$. Thus $w_0$ is an interior point of $f(U)$. Since $w_0$ was arbitrary in $f(U)$ we know that $f(U)$ is open. Since $U$ was arbitrary, the function $f$ is open.

== Applications ==
- Maximum modulus principle
- Rouché's theorem
- Schwarz lemma

== See also ==
- Open mapping theorem (functional analysis)
