= Baire space =

Concept in topology

In mathematics, a topological space $X$ is said to be a Baire space if countable unions of closed sets with empty interior also have empty interior. According to the Baire category theorem, compact Hausdorff spaces and complete metric spaces are examples of Baire spaces. The Baire category theorem combined with the properties of Baire spaces has numerous applications in topology, geometry, and analysis, in particular functional analysis. For more motivation and applications, see the article Baire category theorem. The current article focuses more on characterizations and basic properties of Baire spaces per se.

Bourbaki introduced the term "Baire space" in honor of René Baire, who investigated the Baire category theorem in the context of Euclidean space $\R^n$ in his 1899 thesis.

== Definition ==
Equivalent definitions of a Baire space. Associated properties are painted in the same color. Left: definitions 1, 2, 6; right: definitions 5, 3, 4. (from top to bottom)

The definition that follows is based on the notions of a meagre (or first category) set (namely, a set that is a countable union of sets whose closure has empty interior, i.e., nowhere dense sets) and a nonmeagre (or second category) set (namely, a set that is not meagre). See the corresponding article for details.

A topological space $X$ is called a Baire space if it satisfies any of the following equivalent conditions:

1. Every countable intersection of dense open sets is dense.
2. Every countable union of closed sets with empty interior has empty interior.
3. Every meagre set has empty interior.
4. Every nonempty open set is nonmeagre. (Note: As explained in the meagre set article, for an open set, being nonmeagre in the whole space is equivalent to being nonmeagre in itself.)
5. Every comeagre set is dense.
6. Whenever a countable union of closed sets has an interior point, at least one of the closed sets has an interior point.

The equivalence between these definitions is based on the associated properties of complementary subsets of $X$ (that is, of a set $A\subseteq X$ and of its complement $X\setminus A$) as given in the table below.

Property of a set	Property of complement
open	closed
comeagre	meagre
dense	has empty interior
has dense interior	nowhere dense

The Baire space is kind of the qualitative version of the measure space. For example, the definition 6 above is analogous to the following fact for measure spaces: Whenever a countable union of sets has positive measure, at least one of the sets has positive measure. The advantage of the Baire category approach is that it works well in infinite dimensional cases, where the measure-theoretic approach runs into significant difficulties. The table below shows more ideas they share. However, they are not mathematically equivalent. There exist meagre sets that have positive Lebesgue measure.

Similar ideas between Baire spaces and measure spaces
Baire space (qualitative)	measure space (quantitative)
meagre	zero measure
nonmeagre	positive measure
comeagre	full measure

== Baire category theorem ==
The Baire category theorem gives sufficient conditions for a topological space to be a Baire space.

- (BCT1) Every complete pseudometric space is a Baire space. In particular, every completely metrizable topological space is a Baire space.
- (BCT2) Every locally compact regular space is a Baire space. In particular, every locally compact Hausdorff space is a Baire space.

BCT1 shows that the following are Baire spaces:

- The space $\R$ of real numbers.
- The space of irrational numbers, which is homeomorphic to the Baire space $\omega^{\omega}$ of set theory.
- Every Polish space.

BCT2 shows that the following are Baire spaces:

- Every compact Hausdorff space; for example, the Cantor set (or Cantor space).
- Every manifold, even if it is not paracompact (hence not metrizable), like the long line.

One should note however that there are plenty of spaces that are Baire spaces without satisfying the conditions of the Baire category theorem, as shown in the Examples section below.

== Properties ==
- Every nonempty Baire space is nonmeagre. In terms of countable intersections of dense open sets, being a Baire space is equivalent to such intersections being dense, while being a nonmeagre space is equivalent to the weaker condition that such intersections are nonempty.
- Every open subspace of a Baire space is a Baire space.
- Every dense G_{δ} set in a Baire space is a Baire space. The result need not hold if the G_{δ} set is not dense. See the Examples section.
- Every comeagre set in a Baire space is a Baire space.
- A subset of a Baire space is comeagre if and only if it contains a dense G_{δ} set.
- A closed subspace of a Baire space need not be Baire. See the Examples section.
- If a space contains a dense subspace that is Baire, it is also a Baire space.
- A space that is locally Baire, in the sense that each point has a neighborhood that is a Baire space, is a Baire space.
- Every topological sum of Baire spaces is Baire.
- The product of two Baire spaces is not necessarily Baire.
- An arbitrary product of complete metric spaces is Baire.
- Every locally compact sober space is a Baire space.
- Every finite topological space is a Baire space (because a finite space has only finitely many open sets and the intersection of two open dense sets is an open dense set).
- A topological vector space is a Baire space if and only if it is nonmeagre, which happens if and only if every closed balanced absorbing subset has non-empty interior.

Let $f_n : X \to Y$ be a sequence of continuous functions with pointwise limit $f : X \to Y.$ If $X$ is a Baire space, then the points where $f$ is not continuous is a meagre set in $X$ and the set of points where $f$ is continuous is dense in $X.$ A special case of this is the uniform boundedness principle.

== Examples ==
- The empty space is a Baire space. It is the only space that is both Baire and meagre.
- The space $\R$ of real numbers with the usual topology is a Baire space.
- The space $\Q$ of rational numbers (with the topology induced from $\R$) is not a Baire space, since it is meagre.
- The space of irrational numbers (with the topology induced from $\R$) is a Baire space, since it is comeagre in $\R.$
- The space $X=[0,1]\cup([2,3]\cap\Q)$ (with the topology induced from $\R$) is nonmeagre, but not Baire. There are several ways to see it is not Baire: for example because the subset $[0,1]$ is comeagre but not dense; or because the nonempty subset $[2,3]\cap\Q$ is open and meagre.
- Similarly, the space $X=\{1\}\cup([2,3]\cap\Q)$ is not Baire. It is nonmeagre since $1$ is an isolated point.

The following are examples of Baire spaces for which the Baire category theorem does not apply, because these spaces are not locally compact and not completely metrizable:

- The Sorgenfrey line.
- The Sorgenfrey plane.
- The Niemytzki plane.
- The subspace of $\R^2$ consisting of the open upper half plane together with the rationals on the x-axis, namely, $X=(\R\times(0,\infty))\cup(\Q\times\{0\}),$ is a Baire space, because the open upper half plane is dense in $X$ and completely metrizable, hence Baire. The space $X$ is not locally compact and not completely metrizable. The set $\Q\times\{0\}$ is closed in $X$, but is not a Baire space. Since in a metric space closed sets are G_{δ} sets, this also shows that in general G_{δ} sets in a Baire space need not be Baire.

Over an uncountable field, algebraic varieties with the Zariski topology are Baire spaces. An example is the affine space $\mathbb{A}^n$ consisting of the set $\mathbb{C}^n$ of n-tuples of complex numbers, together with the topology whose closed sets are the vanishing sets of polynomials $f \in \mathbb{C}[x_1,\ldots,x_n].$

== See also ==
- Banach–Mazur game – Type of topological game with two players
- Barrelled space – Type of topological vector space
- Blumberg theorem – Any real function on R admits a continuous restriction on a dense subset of R
- Choquet game – Topological game
- Property of Baire – Difference of an open set by a meager set
- Webbed space – Space where open mapping and closed graph theorems hold
