= Baire category theorem =

On topological spaces where the intersection of countably many dense open sets is dense

The Baire category theorem (BCT) is an important result in general topology and functional analysis. The theorem has two forms, each of which gives sufficient conditions for a topological space to be a Baire space (a topological space such that the intersection of countably many dense open sets is still dense). It is used in the proof of results in many areas of analysis and geometry, including some of the fundamental theorems of functional analysis.

Versions of the Baire category theorem were first proved independently in 1897 by Osgood for the real line $\R$ and in 1899 by Baire for Euclidean space $\R^n$. The more general statement for completely metrizable spaces was first shown by Hausdorff in 1914.

== Statement ==
A Baire space is a topological space $X$ in which every countable intersection of open dense sets is dense in $X.$ See the corresponding article for a list of equivalent characterizations, as some are more useful than others depending on the application.

- (BCT1) Every completely metrizable topological space is a Baire space. More generally, every complete pseudometric space is a Baire space.
- (BCT2) Every locally compact Hausdorff space is a Baire space. More generally, every locally compact regular space is a Baire space.

Neither of these statements directly implies the other, since there are complete metric spaces that are not locally compact (the irrational numbers with the metric defined below; also, any Banach space of infinite dimension), and there are locally compact Hausdorff spaces that are not metrizable (for instance, any uncountable product of non-trivial compact Hausdorff spaces; also, several function spaces used in functional analysis; the uncountable Fort space). See Steen and Seebach in the references below.

== Relation to the axiom of choice ==
The proof of BCT1 for arbitrary complete metric spaces requires some form of the axiom of choice; and in fact BCT1 is equivalent over ZF to the axiom of dependent choice, a weak form of the axiom of choice.

A restricted form of the Baire category theorem, in which the complete metric space is also assumed to be separable, is provable in ZF with no additional choice principles. This restricted form applies in particular to the real line, the Baire space $\omega^{\omega},$ the Cantor space $2^{\omega},$ and a separable Hilbert space such as the $L^p$-space $L^2(\R^n)$.

== Uses ==
In functional analysis, BCT1 can be used to prove the open mapping theorem, the closed graph theorem and the uniform boundedness principle.

BCT1 also shows that every nonempty complete metric space with no isolated point is uncountable. (If $X$ is a nonempty countable metric space with no isolated point, then each singleton $\{x\}$ in $X$ is nowhere dense, and $X$ is meagre in itself.) In particular, this proves that the set of all real numbers is uncountable.

BCT1 shows that each of the following is a Baire space:

- The space $\R$ of real numbers
- The irrational numbers, with the metric defined by $d(x, y) = \tfrac{1}{n+1},$ where $n$ is the first index for which the continued fraction expansions of $x$ and $y$ differ (this is a complete metric space)
- The Cantor set

By BCT2, every finite-dimensional Hausdorff manifold is a Baire space, since it is locally compact and Hausdorff. This is so even for non-paracompact (hence nonmetrizable) manifolds such as the long line.

BCT is used to prove Hartogs's theorem, a fundamental result in the theory of several complex variables.

BCT1 is used to prove that a Banach space cannot have countably infinite algebraic (also known as Hamel) dimension.

== Proof ==
(BCT1) The following is a standard proof that a complete pseudometric space $X$ is a Baire space.

Let $U_1, U_2, \ldots$ be a countable collection of open dense subsets. We want to show that the intersection $U_1 \cap U_2 \cap \ldots$ is dense. A subset is dense if and only if every nonempty open subset intersects it. Thus to show that the intersection is dense, it suffices to show that any nonempty open subset $W$ of $X$ has some point $x$ in common with all of the $U_n$. Because $U_1$ is dense, $W$ intersects $U_1;$ consequently, there exists a point $x_1$ and a number $0 < r_1 < 1$ such that:
$$\overline{B}\left(x_1, r_1\right) \subseteq W \cap U_1$$
where $B(x, r)$ and $\overline{B}(x, r)$ denote an open and closed ball, respectively, centered at $x$ with radius $r.$ Since each $U_n$ is dense, this construction can be continued recursively to find a pair of sequences $x_n$ and $0 < r_n < \tfrac{1}{n}$ such that:
$$\overline{B}\left(x_n, r_n\right) \subseteq B\left(x_{n-1}, r_{n-1}\right) \cap U_n.$$

(This step relies on the axiom of choice and the fact that a finite intersection of open sets is open and hence an open ball can be found inside it centered at $x_n$.) The sequence $\left(x_n\right)$ is Cauchy because $x_n \in B\left(x_m, r_m\right)$ whenever $n > m,$ and hence $\left(x_n\right)$ converges to some limit $x$ by completeness. If $n$ is a positive integer then $x \in \overline{B}\left(x_n, r_n\right)$ (because this set is closed). Thus $x \in W$ and $x \in U_n$ for all $n.$ $\blacksquare$

There is an alternative proof using Choquet's game.

(BCT2) The proof that a locally compact regular space $X$ is a Baire space is similar. It uses the facts that (1) in such a space every point has a local base of closed compact neighborhoods; and (2) in a compact space any collection of closed sets with the finite intersection property has nonempty intersection. The result for locally compact Hausdorff spaces is a special case, as such spaces are regular.
