= F-space =

Topological vector space with a complete translation-invariant metric

In functional analysis, an F-space is a vector space $X$ over the real or complex numbers together with a metric $d : X \times X \to \R$ such that

1. Scalar multiplication in $X$ is continuous with respect to $d$ and the standard metric on $\R$ or $\Complex.$
2. Addition in $X$ is continuous with respect to $d.$
3. The metric is translation-invariant; that is, $d(x + a, y + a) = d(x, y)$ for all $x, y, a \in X.$
4. The metric space $(X, d)$ is complete.

The operation $x \mapsto \|x\| := d(0, x)$ is called an F-norm, although in general an F-norm is not required to be homogeneous. By translation-invariance, the metric is recoverable from the F-norm. Thus, a real or complex F-space is equivalently a real or complex vector space equipped with a complete F-norm.

Some authors use the term Fréchet space rather than F-space, but usually the term "Fréchet space" is reserved for locally convex F-spaces. Some other authors use the term "F-space" as a synonym of "Fréchet space", by which they mean a locally convex complete metrizable topological vector space. The metric may or may not necessarily be part of the structure on an F-space; many authors only require that such a space be metrizable in a manner that satisfies the above properties.

== Examples ==
All Banach spaces and Fréchet spaces are F-spaces. In particular, a Banach space is an F-space with an additional requirement that $d(a x, 0) = |a| d(x, 0).$

The L^{p} spaces can be made into F-spaces for all $p \geq 0$ and for $p \geq 1$ they can be made into locally convex and thus Fréchet spaces and even Banach spaces.

=== Example 1 ===
$L^{\frac{1}{2}}[0,\, 1]$ is an F-space. It admits no continuous seminorms and no continuous linear functionals — it has trivial dual space.

=== Example 2 ===
Let $W_p(\mathbb{D})$ be the space of all complex valued Taylor series
$$f(z) = \sum_{n \geq 0} a_n z^n$$
on the unit disc $\mathbb{D}$ such that
$$\sum_n \left|a_n\right|^p < \infty$$
then for $0 < p < 1,$ $W_p(\mathbb{D})$ are F-spaces under the p-norm:
$$\|f\|_p = \sum_n \left|a_n\right|^p \qquad (0 < p < 1).$$

In fact, $W_p$ is a quasi-Banach algebra. Moreover, for any $\zeta$ with $|\zeta| \leq 1$ the map $f \mapsto f(\zeta)$ is a bounded linear (multiplicative functional) on $W_p(\mathbb{D}).$

== Sufficient conditions ==
Theorem (Klee (1952))—Let $d$ be any (Note: Not assume to be translation-invariant.) metric on a vector space $X$ such that the topology $\tau$ induced by $d$ on $X$ makes $(X, \tau)$ into a topological vector space. If $(X, d)$ is a complete metric space then $(X, \tau)$ is a complete topological vector space.

== Related properties ==
The open mapping theorem implies that if $\tau \text{ and } \tau_2$ are topologies on $X$ that make both $(X, \tau)$ and $\left(X, \tau_2\right)$ into complete metrizable topological vector spaces (for example, Banach or Fréchet spaces) and if one topology is finer or coarser than the other then they must be equal (that is, if $\tau \subseteq \tau_2 \text{ or } \tau_2 \subseteq \tau \text{ then } \tau = \tau_2$).

- A linear almost continuous map into an F-space whose graph is closed is continuous.
- A linear almost open map into an F-space whose graph is closed is necessarily an open map.
- A linear continuous almost open map from an F-space is necessarily an open map.
- A linear continuous almost open map from an F-space whose image is of the second category in the codomain is necessarily a surjective open map.

== See also ==
- Banach space – Normed vector space that is complete
- Barreled space – Type of topological vector space
- Countably quasi-barrelled space
- Complete metric space – Metric geometry
- Complete topological vector space – Structure in functional analysis
- DF-space
- Fréchet space – Locally convex topological vector space that is also a complete metric space
- Hilbert space – Type of vector space in math
- K-space (functional analysis)
- LB-space
- LF-space – Topological vector space
- Metrizable topological vector space – Topological vector space whose topology can be defined by a metric
- Nuclear space – Generalization of finite-dimensional Euclidean spaces different from Hilbert spaces
- Projective tensor product

== Sources ==
- Husain, Taqdir; Khaleelulla, S. M. (1978). Barrelledness in Topological and Ordered Vector Spaces. Lecture Notes in Mathematics. Vol. 692. Berlin, New York, Heidelberg: Springer-Verlag. ISBN 978-3-540-09096-0. OCLC 4493665.
- Khaleelulla, S. M. (1982). Counterexamples in Topological Vector Spaces. Lecture Notes in Mathematics. Vol. 936. Berlin, Heidelberg, New York: Springer-Verlag. ISBN 978-3-540-11565-6. OCLC 8588370.
- Narici, Lawrence; Beckenstein, Edward (2011). Topological Vector Spaces. Pure and applied mathematics (Second ed.). Boca Raton, FL: CRC Press. ISBN 978-1584888666. OCLC 144216834.
- Rudin, Walter (1966). Real & Complex Analysis. McGraw-Hill. ISBN 0-07-054234-1.
- Rudin, Walter (1991). Functional Analysis. International Series in Pure and Applied Mathematics. Vol. 8 (Second ed.). New York, NY: McGraw-Hill Science/Engineering/Math. ISBN 978-0-07-054236-5. OCLC 21163277.
- Schaefer, Helmut H.; Wolff, Manfred P. (1999). Topological Vector Spaces. GTM. Vol. 8 (Second ed.). New York, NY: Springer New York Imprint Springer. ISBN 978-1-4612-7155-0. OCLC 840278135.
- Schechter, Eric (1996). Handbook of Analysis and Its Foundations. San Diego, CA: Academic Press. ISBN 978-0-12-622760-4. OCLC 175294365.
- Trèves, François (2006) [1967]. Topological Vector Spaces, Distributions and Kernels. Mineola, N.Y.: Dover Publications. ISBN 978-0-486-45352-1. OCLC 853623322.
