= Property of Baire =

Difference of an open set by a meager set

A subset $A$ of a topological space $X$ has the property of Baire (Baire property, named after René-Louis Baire), or is called an almost open set, if it differs from an open set by a meager set; that is, if there is an open set $U\subseteq X$ such that $A \bigtriangleup U$ is meager (where $\bigtriangleup$ denotes the symmetric difference).

== Definitions ==
A subset $A \subseteq X$ of a topological space $X$ is called almost open and is said to have the property of Baire or the Baire property if there is an open set $U\subseteq X$ such that $A \bigtriangleup U$ is a meager subset, where $\bigtriangleup$ denotes the symmetric difference. Further, $A$ has the Baire property in the restricted sense if for every subset $E$ of $X$ the intersection $A\cap E$ has the Baire property relative to $E$.

== Properties ==
The family of sets with the property of Baire forms a σ-algebra. That is, the complement of an almost open set is almost open, and any countable union or intersection of almost open sets is again almost open. Since every open set is almost open (the empty set is meager), it follows that every Borel set is almost open.

If a subset of a Polish space has the property of Baire, then its corresponding Banach–Mazur game is determined. The converse does not hold; however, if every game in a given adequate pointclass $\Gamma$ is determined, then every set in $\Gamma$ has the property of Baire. Therefore, it follows from projective determinacy, which in turn follows from sufficient large cardinals, that every projective set (in a Polish space) has the property of Baire.

It follows from the axiom of choice that there are sets of reals without the property of Baire. In particular, a Vitali set does not have the property of Baire. Already weaker versions of choice are sufficient: the Boolean prime ideal theorem implies that there is a nonprincipal ultrafilter on the set of natural numbers; each such ultrafilter induces, via binary representations of reals, a set of reals without the Baire property.

== See also ==
- Almost open map – Map that satisfies a condition similar to that of being an open map
- Baire category theorem – On topological spaces where the intersection of countably many dense open sets is dense
- Open set – Basic subset of a topological space
