= Closed linear operator =

Linear operator whose graph is closed

In functional analysis, a branch of mathematics, a closed linear operator or often a closed operator is a partially defined linear operator whose graph is closed (see closed graph property). It is a basic example of an unbounded operator.

The closed graph theorem states that a linear operator $f : X \to Y$ between Banach spaces, with full domain $X$, is a closed operator if and only if it is a bounded operator. In practice, many operators are unbounded, but it is still desirable to make them have a closed graph. Hence, they cannot be defined on all of $X$. To stay useful, they are instead defined on a proper but dense subspace, which still allows approximating any vector and keeps key tools (closures, adjoints, spectral theory) available.

== Definition ==
It is common in functional analysis to consider partial functions, which are functions defined on a subset of some space $X.$ A partial function $f$ is declared with the notation $f : D \subseteq X \to Y,$ which indicates that $f$ has prototype $f : D \to Y$ (that is, its domain is $D$ and its codomain is $Y$)

Every partial function is, in particular, a function and so all terminology for functions can be applied to them. For instance, the graph of a partial function $f$ is the set $\operatorname{graph}{\!(f)} = \{(x, f(x)) : x \in \operatorname{dom} f\}.$ However, one exception to this is the definition of "closed graph". A partial function $f : D \subseteq X \to Y$ is said to have a closed graph if $\operatorname{graph} f$ is a closed subset of $X \times Y$ in the product topology; importantly, note that the product space is $X \times Y$ and not $D \times Y = \operatorname{dom} f \times Y$ as it was defined above for ordinary functions. In contrast, when $f : D \to Y$ is considered as an ordinary function (rather than as the partial function $f : D \subseteq X \to Y$), then "having a closed graph" would instead mean that $\operatorname{graph} f$ is a closed subset of $D \times Y.$ If $\operatorname{graph} f$ is a closed subset of $X \times Y$ then it is also a closed subset of $\operatorname{dom} (f) \times Y$ although the converse is not guaranteed in general.

Definition: If X and Y are topological vector spaces (TVSs) then we call a linear map f : D(f) ⊆ X → Y a closed linear operator if its graph is closed in X × Y.

The antonym of "closed" is "unclosed", that is, an unclosed linear operator is a linear operator whose graph is strictly smaller than its closure.

=== Closable maps and closures ===
A linear operator $f : D \subseteq X \to Y$ is closable in $X \times Y$ if there exists a vector subspace $E \subseteq X$ containing $D$ and a function (resp. multifunction) $F : E \to Y$ whose graph is equal to the closure of the set $\operatorname{graph} f$ in $X \times Y.$ Such an $F$ is called a closure of $f$ in $X \times Y$, is denoted by $\overline{f},$ and necessarily extends $f.$

If $f : D \subseteq X \to Y$ is a closable linear operator then a core or an essential domain of $f$ is a subset $C \subseteq D$ such that the closure in $X \times Y$ of the graph of the restriction $f\big\vert_C : C \to Y$ of $f$ to $C$ is equal to the closure of the graph of $f$ in $X \times Y$ (i.e. the closure of $\operatorname{graph} f$ in $X \times Y$ is equal to the closure of $\operatorname{graph} f\big\vert_C$ in $X \times Y$).

== Examples ==
A closed operator between Banach spaces, is bounded, by the closed graph theorem. More interesting examples of closed operators are unbounded.

If $(X, \tau)$ is a Hausdorff TVS and $\nu$ is a vector topology on $X$ that is strictly finer than $\tau,$ then the identity map $\operatorname{Id} : (X, \tau) \to (X, \nu)$ a closed discontinuous linear operator.

Consider the derivative operator $f = \frac{d}{d x}$ where $X = Y = C([a, b])$ is the Banach space (with supremum norm) of all continuous functions on an interval $[a, b].$ If one takes its domain $D(f)$ to be $C^1([a, b]),$ then $f$ is a closed operator, which is not bounded. On the other hand, if $D(f)$ is the space $C^\infty([a, b])$ of smooth scalar valued functions then $f$ will no longer be closed, but it will be closable, with the closure being its extension defined on $C^1([a, b]).$ To show that $f$ is not closed when restricted to $C^\infty([a, b]) \to C^\infty([a, b])$, take a function $u$ that is $C^1$ but not smooth, such as $u(x) = x^{3/2}$. Then mollify it to a sequence of smooth functions $(u_n)_{n \in \N}$ such that $\|u_n - u \|_\infty \to 0$, then $\|f(u_n) - u' \|_\infty \to 0$, but $(u, u')$ is not in the graph of $f|_{C^\infty([a, b])}$.

== Basic properties ==
The following properties are easily checked for a linear operator $f : \operatorname{D}(f) \subseteq X \to Y$ between Banach spaces:

- If $f$ is defined on the entire domain $X$, then $f$ is closed iff it is bounded.
- If $A$ is closed then $A - \lambda \mathrm{Id}_{\operatorname{D}(f)}$ is closed where $\lambda$ is a scalar and $\mathrm{Id}_{\operatorname{D}(f)}$ is the identity function;
- If $f$ is closed, then its kernel (or nullspace) is a closed vector subspace of $X$;
- If $f$ is closed and injective then its inverse $f^{-1}$ is also closed;
- A linear operator $f$ admits a closure if and only if for every $x \in X$ and every pair of sequences $x_{\bullet} = (x_i)_{i=1}^{\infty}$ and $y_{\bullet} = (y_i)_{i=1}^{\infty}$ in $\operatorname{D}(f)$ both converging to $x$ in $X$, such that both $f(x_{\bullet}) = (f(x_i))_{i=1}^{\infty}$ and $f(y_{\bullet}) = (f(y_i))_{i=1}^{\infty}$ converge in $Y$, one has $\lim_{i \to \infty} f(x_i) = \lim_{i \to \infty} f(y_i)$.
