= François Trèves =

American mathematician

- Born: Jean François Trèves; 23 April 1930 (age 95); Brussels
- Citizenship: Italian until 1972, also USA since 1972
- Education: Paris-Sorbonne University
- Known for: Partial differential equations
- Awards: Chauvenet Prize, Guggenheim Fellow, Leroy P. Steele Prize; Bergman Prize; foreign member of the Brazilian Academy of Sciences; Doctorate Honoris Causa, University of Pisa, Italy; fellow of the American Mathematical Society
- Scientific career
- Fields: Mathematics
- Institutions: University of California, Berkeley; Yeshiva University; Purdue University; Rutgers University
- Academic advisors: Laurent Schwartz

J. (Jean) François Trèves (born April 23, 1930, in Brussels) is an American mathematician, specializing in partial differential equations.

Trèves earned his Ph.D. in 1958 from Paris-Sorbonne University under the supervision of Laurent Schwartz. He then went to the United States where from 1958 to 1960 he was assistant professor at the University of California, Berkeley. From 1961 to 1964 he was an associate professor at Yeshiva University, and from 1964 to 1970 professor at Purdue University. In 1970 he became a professor at Rutgers University, and then, in 1984, Robert-Adrian professor of mathematics. He became professor emeritus in 2005.

In 1972 he received the Chauvenet Prize for "On local solvability of linear partial differential equations" in the Bulletin of the AMS (Volume 76, 1970, pp. 552–571). It was about the problem he worked in 1962 with Louis Nirenberg with whom he found necessary and sufficient conditions for the solvability of equations with analytic coefficients, 1969 (Comptes Rendus de l'Académie des Sciences Paris Bd.269). The question was first presented to him in 1955 by Schwartz as a thesis problem.

In 1977 he was Guggenheim Fellow. In 1991 he received the Leroy P. Steele Prize for his book on pseudo-differential operators and Fourier integral operators. In 2003 he became a foreign member of the Brazilian Academy of Sciences. In 1970 he was an invited speaker at the International Congress of Mathematicians in Nice (Hamiltonian fields, bicharacteristic strips in relation with existence and regularity of solutions of linear partial differential equations). He is a fellow of the American Mathematical Society.

== Writings ==
=== Articles ===
- "On the theory of linear partial differential operators with analytic coefficients." Transactions of the American Mathematical Society 137 (1969): 1–20. doi:10.2307/1994784
- "An abstract nonlinear Cauchy-Kovalevska theorem." Transactions of the American Mathematical Society 150, no. 1 (1970): 77–92. MR 0274911
- "Differential polynomials and decay at infinity." Bulletin of the American Mathematical Society 66, no. 3 (1960): 184–186. MR 0117448
- "Discrete phenomena in uniqueness in the Cauchy problem." Proceedings of the American Mathematical Society 46, no. 2 (1974): 229–233. MR 0352679
- with Howard Jacobowitz: "Nowhere solvable homogeneous partial differential equations." Bulletin of the American Mathematical Society 8, no. 3 (1983): 467–469. MR 0693964
- with Nicholas Hanges: "On the analyticity of solutions of first-order nonlinear PDE." Transactions of the American Mathematical Society 331, no. 2 (1992): 627–638. MR 1061776

=== Books ===
- Treves, François (1967). Locally Convex Spaces and Linear Partial Differential Equations. Berlin, Heidelberg: Springer Berlin Heidelberg. doi:10.1007/978-3-642-87371-3. ISBN 978-3-642-87373-7.
- Treves, François (1968). Linear Partial Differential Equations with Constant Coefficients. New York, N. Y.: Gordon and Breach.
- Treves, François (2022). Analytic Partial Differential Equations. Grundlehren der mathematischen Wissenschaften. Vol. 359. Cham: Springer International Publishing. doi:10.1007/978-3-030-94055-3. ISBN 978-3-030-94054-6.
- Treves, François (1980). Introduction to Pseudodifferential and Fourier Integral Operators Volume 1. Boston, MA: Springer US. doi:10.1007/978-1-4684-8780-0. ISBN 978-1-4684-8782-4.
- Treves, Francois (2006). Basic linear partial differential equations. Dover books on mathematics. Mineola, N.Y: Dover Publications. ISBN 978-0-486-45346-0.
- Treves, Francois (2006). Topological vector spaces, distributions and kernels. Dover books on mathematics. Mineola, N.Y: Dover Publications. ISBN 978-0-486-45352-1.
- Cordaro, Paulo D.; Treves, Francois (1994). Hyperfunctions on hypo-analytic manifolds. Annals of mathematics studies. Princeton, N.J: Princeton University Press. ISBN 978-0-691-02993-1.
- Treves, François (2014). Hypo-Analytic Structures (PMS-40), Volume 40: Local Theory (PMS-40) (Course Book ed.). Princeton, NJ: Princeton University Press. ISBN 978-0-691-63541-5.
- Treves, Francois (1990). Homotopy formulas in the tangential Cauchy-Riemann complex. Providence, R.I., USA: American Mathematical Society. ISBN 978-1-4704-0857-2.
