= Near sets =

Concept in mathematical set theory

Figure 1. Descriptively, very near sets

In mathematics, near sets are either spatially close or descriptively close. Spatially close sets have nonempty intersection. In other words, spatially close sets are not disjoint sets, since they always have at least one element in common. Descriptively close sets contain elements that have matching descriptions. Such sets can be either disjoint or non-disjoint sets. Spatially near sets are also descriptively near sets.

Figure 2. Descriptively, minimally near sets

The underlying assumption with descriptively close sets is that such sets contain elements that have location and measurable features such as colour and frequency of occurrence. The description of the element of a set is defined by a feature vector. Comparison of feature vectors provides a basis for measuring the closeness of descriptively near sets. Near set theory provides a formal basis for the observation, comparison, and classification of elements in sets based on their closeness, either spatially or descriptively. Near sets offer a framework for solving problems based on human perception that arise in areas such as image processing, computer vision as well as engineering and science problems.

Near sets have a variety of applications in areas such as topology, pattern detection and classification, abstract algebra, mathematics in computer science, and solving a variety of problems based on human perception that arise in areas such as image analysis, image processing, face recognition, ethology, as well as engineering and science problems. From the beginning, descriptively near sets have proved to be useful in applications of topology, and visual pattern recognition, spanning a broad spectrum of applications that include camouflage detection, micropaleontology, handwriting forgery detection, biomedical image analysis, content-based image retrieval, population dynamics, quotient topology, textile design, visual merchandising, and topological psychology.

As an illustration of the degree of descriptive nearness between two sets, consider an example of the Henry colour model for varying degrees of nearness between sets of picture elements in pictures (see, e.g., §4.3). The two pairs of ovals in Fig. 1 and Fig. 2 contain coloured segments. Each segment in the figures corresponds to an equivalence class where all pixels in the class have similar descriptions, i.e., picture elements with similar colours. The ovals in Fig.1 are closer to each other descriptively than the ovals in Fig. 2.

== History ==
It has been observed that the simple concept of nearness unifies various concepts of topological structures inasmuch as the category Near of all nearness spaces and nearness preserving maps contains categories sTop (symmetric topological spaces and continuous maps), Prox (proximity spaces and $\delta$-maps), Unif (uniform spaces and uniformly continuous maps) and Cont (contiguity spaces and contiguity maps) as embedded full subcategories. The categories $\boldsymbol{\varepsilon{ANear}}$ and $\boldsymbol{\varepsilon{AMer}}$ are shown to be full supercategories of various well-known categories, including the category $\boldsymbol{sTop}$ of symmetric topological spaces and continuous maps, and the category $\boldsymbol{Met^\infty}$ of extended metric spaces and nonexpansive maps. The notation $\boldsymbol{A}\hookrightarrow\boldsymbol{B}$ reads category $\boldsymbol{A}$ is embedded in category $\boldsymbol{B}$. The categories $\boldsymbol{\varepsilon AMer}$ and $\boldsymbol{\varepsilon ANear}$ are supercategories for a variety of familiar categories shown in Fig. 3. Let $\boldsymbol{\varepsilon{ANear}}$ denote the category of all $\varepsilon$-approach nearness spaces and contractions, and let $\boldsymbol{\varepsilon AMer}$ denote the category of all $\varepsilon$-approach merotopic spaces and contractions.

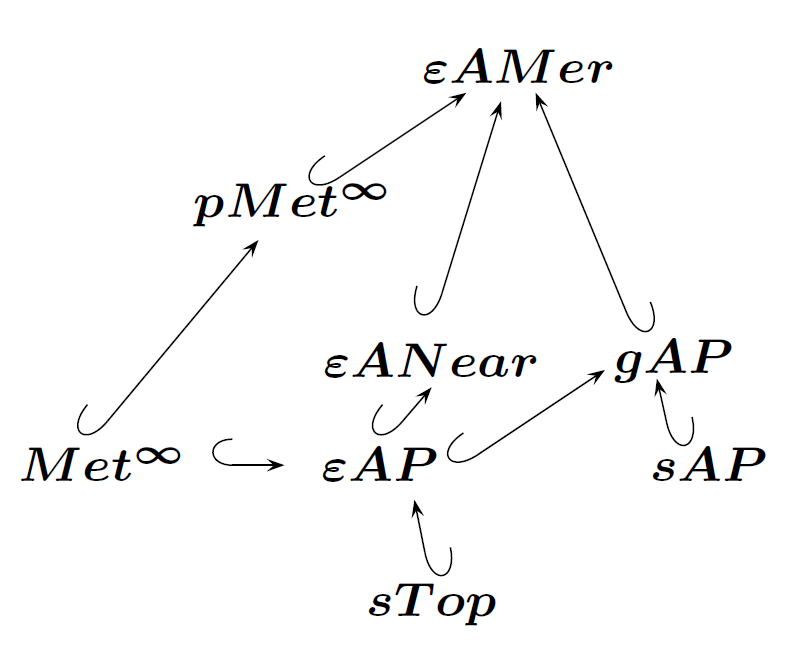
Figure 3. Supercats

Among these familiar categories is $\boldsymbol{sTop}$, the symmetric form of $\boldsymbol{Top}$ (see category of topological spaces), the category with objects that are topological spaces and morphisms that are continuous maps between them. $\boldsymbol{Met^{\infty}}$ with objects that are extended metric spaces is a subcategory of $\boldsymbol{\varepsilon AP}$ (having objects $\varepsilon$-approach spaces and contractions) (see also). Let $\rho_X,\rho_Y$ be extended pseudometrics on nonempty sets $X,Y$, respectively. The map $f:(X,\rho_X)\longrightarrow(Y,\rho_Y)$ is a contraction if and only if $f:(X,\nu_{D_{\rho_X}})\longrightarrow(Y,\nu_{D_{\rho_Y}})$ is a contraction. For nonempty subsets $A,B\in 2^X$ , the distance function $D_{\rho}:2^X\times 2^X\longrightarrow [0,\infty]$ is defined by

$$D_{\rho}(A,B) =\begin{cases}
\inf{\{\rho(a,b): a\in A, b\in B\}}, &\text{if }A\text{ and }B\text{ are not empty},\\
\infty, &\text{if }A\text{ or }B\text{ is empty}.
\end{cases}$$

Thus $\boldsymbol{\varepsilon}$AP is embedded as a full subcategory in $\boldsymbol{\varepsilon{ANear}}$ by the functor $F: \boldsymbol{\varepsilon{AP}}\longrightarrow \boldsymbol{\varepsilon{ANear}}$ defined by $F((X,\rho))=(X,\nu_{D_{\rho}})$ and $F(f)=f$. Then $f:(X,\rho_X)\longrightarrow(Y,\rho_Y)$ is a contraction if and only if $f:(X,\nu_{D_{\rho_X}})\longrightarrow(Y,\nu_{D_{\rho_Y}})$ is a contraction. Thus $\boldsymbol{\varepsilon{AP}}$ is embedded as a full subcategory in $\boldsymbol{\varepsilon{ANear}}$ by the functor $F: \boldsymbol{\varepsilon{AP}}\longrightarrow \boldsymbol{\varepsilon{ANear}}$ defined by $F((X,\rho))=(X,\nu_{D_{\rho}})$ and $F(f)=f.$ Since the category $\boldsymbol{Met^\infty}$ of extended metric spaces and nonexpansive maps is a full subcategory of $\boldsymbol{\varepsilon{AP}}$, therefore, $\boldsymbol{\varepsilon{ANear}}$ is also a full supercategory of $\boldsymbol{Met^\infty}$. The category $\boldsymbol{\varepsilon{ANear}}$ is a topological construct.

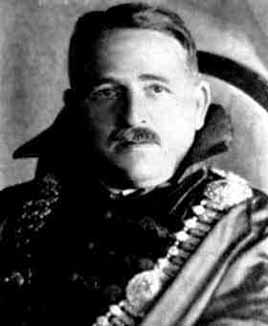
Figure 4. Frigyes Riesz, 1880-1956

The notions of near and far in mathematics can be traced back to works by Johann Benedict Listing and Felix Hausdorff. The related notions of resemblance and similarity can be traced back to J.H. Poincaré, who introduced sets of similar sensations (nascent tolerance classes) to represent the results of G.T. Fechner's sensation sensitivity experiments and a framework for the study of resemblance in representative spaces as models of what he termed physical continua. The elements of a physical continuum (pc) are sets of sensations. The notion of a pc and various representative spaces (tactile, visual, motor spaces) were introduced by Poincaré in an 1894 article on the mathematical continuum, an 1895 article on space and geometry and a compendious 1902 book on science and hypothesis followed by a number of elaborations, e.g.,. The 1893 and 1895 articles on continua (Pt. 1, ch. II) as well as representative spaces and geometry (Pt. 2, ch IV) are included as chapters in. Later, F. Riesz introduced the concept of proximity or nearness of pairs of sets at the International Congress of Mathematicians (ICM) in 1908.

During the 1960s, E.C. Zeeman introduced tolerance spaces in modelling visual perception. A.B. Sossinsky observed in 1986 that the main idea underlying tolerance space theory comes from Poincaré, especially. In 2002, Z. Pawlak and J. Peters considered an informal approach to the perception of the nearness of physical objects such as snowflakes that was not limited to spatial nearness. In 2006, a formal approach to the descriptive nearness of objects was considered by J. Peters, A. Skowron and J. Stepaniuk in the context of proximity spaces. In 2007, descriptively near sets were introduced by J. Peters followed by the introduction of tolerance near sets. Recently, the study of descriptively near sets has led to algebraic, topological and proximity space foundations of such sets.

== Nearness of sets ==
The adjective near in the context of near sets is used to denote the fact that observed feature value differences of distinct objects are small enough to be considered indistinguishable, i.e., within some tolerance.

The exact idea of closeness or 'resemblance' or of 'being within tolerance' is universal enough to appear, quite naturally, in almost any mathematical setting (see, e.g.,). It is especially natural in mathematical applications: practical problems, more often than not, deal with approximate input data and only require viable results with a tolerable level of error.

The words near and far are used in daily life and it was an incisive suggestion of F. Riesz that these intuitive concepts be made rigorous. He introduced the concept of nearness of pairs of sets at the ICM in Rome in 1908. This concept is useful in simplifying teaching calculus and advanced calculus. For example, the passage from an intuitive definition of continuity of a function at a point to its rigorous epsilon-delta definition is sometime difficult for teachers to explain and for students to understand. Intuitively, continuity can be explained using nearness language, i.e., a function $f:\mathbb{R}\rightarrow\mathbb{R}$ is continuous at a point $c$, provided points $\{x\}$ near $c$ go into points $\{f(x)\}$ near $f(c)$. Using Riesz's idea, this definition can be made more precise and its contrapositive is the familiar definition.

== Generalization of set intersection ==
From a spatial point of view, nearness (a.k.a. proximity) is considered a generalization of set intersection. For disjoint sets, a form of nearness set intersection is defined in terms of a set of objects (extracted from disjoint sets) that have similar features within some tolerance (see, e.g., §3 in). For example, the ovals in Fig. 1 are considered near each other, since these ovals contain pairs of classes that display similar (visually indistinguishable) colours.

== Efremovič proximity space ==
Let $X$ denote a metric topological space that is endowed with one or more proximity relations and let $2^X$ denote the collection of all subsets of $X$. The collection $2^X$ is called the power set of $X$.

There are many ways to define Efremovič proximities on topological spaces (discrete proximity, standard proximity, metric proximity, Čech proximity, Alexandroff proximity, and Freudenthal proximity), For details, see § 2, pp. 93–94 in. The focus here is on standard proximity on a topological space. For $A,B\subset X$, $A$ is near $B$ (denoted by $A\ \delta\ B$), provided their closures share a common point.

The closure of a subset $A\in 2^X$ (denoted by $\mbox{cl}(A)$) is the usual Kuratowski closure of a set, introduced in § 4, p. 20, is defined by

$$\begin{align}
\mbox{cl}(A) &= \left\{x\in X: D(x,A)=0\right\},\ \mbox{where}\\
D(x,A) &= \inf\left\{d(x,a): a\in A\right\}.
\end{align}$$

I.e., $\mbox{cl}(A)$ is the set of all points $x$ in $X$ that are close to $A$ ($D(x,A)$ is the Hausdorff distance (see § 22, p. 128, in) between $x$ and the set $A$ and $d(x,a) = \left|x - a \right|$ (standard distance)). A standard proximity relation is defined by

$$\delta = \left\{(A,B)\in 2^X\times 2^X: \mbox{cl}(A)\ \cap\ \mbox{cl}(B)\neq\emptyset\right\}.$$

Whenever sets $A$ and $B$ have no points in common, the sets are farfrom each other (denoted $A\ \underline{\delta}\ B$).

The following EF-proximity space axioms are given by Jurij Michailov Smirnov based on what Vadim Arsenyevič Efremovič introduced during the first half of the 1930s. Let $A,B,E\in 2^X$.

EF.1
If the set $A$ is close to $B$, then $B$ is close to $A$.
EF.2
$A\cup B$ is close to $E$, if and only if, at least one of the sets $A$ or $B$ is close to $E$.
EF.3
Two points are close, if and only if, they are the same point.
EF.4
All sets are far from the empty set $\emptyset$.
EF.5
For any two sets $A$ and $B$ which are far from each other, there exists $C,D\in 2^X$, $C\cup D = X$, such that $A$ is far from $C$ and $B$ is far from $D$ (Efremovič-axiom).

The pair $(X, \delta)$ is called an EF-proximity space. In this context, a space is a set with some added structure. With a proximity space $X$, the structure of $X$ is induced by the EF-proximity relation $\delta$. In a proximity space $X$, the closure of $A$ in $X$ coincides with the intersection of all closed sets that contain $A$.

Theorem 1
The closure of any set $A$ in the proximity space $X$ is the set of points $x\in X$ that are close to $A$.

== Visualization of EF-axiom ==
Figure 5. Example of a descriptive EF-proximity relation between sets $A, B$, and $C^c$

Let the set $X$ be represented by the points inside the rectangular region in Fig. 5. Also, let $A,B$ be any two non-intersection subsets (i.e. subsets spatially far from each other) in $X$, as shown in Fig. 5. Let $C^c = X \backslash C$ (complement of the set $C$). Then from the EF-axiom, observe the following:

$$\begin{align}
A &{}\mathrel{\underline{\delta}} B,\\
B &\subset C,\\
D &= C^c,\\
X &= D \cup C,\\
A &\subset D,\ \mbox{hence, we can write}\\
A\ \underline{\delta}\ B\ &\Rightarrow\ A\ \underline{\delta}\ C\ \mbox{and}\ B\ \underline{\delta}\ D,\ \mbox{for some}\ C,D\ \mbox{in}\ X \mbox{ so that } C\cup D = X. \qquad \blacksquare
\end{align}$$

== Descriptive proximity space ==
Descriptively near sets were introduced as a means of solving classification and pattern recognition problems arising from disjoint sets that resemble each other. Recently, the connections between near sets in EF-spaces and near sets in descriptive EF-proximity spaces have been explored in.

Again, let $X$ be a metric topological space and let $\Phi = \left\{\phi_1, \dots, \phi_n\right\}$ a set of probe functions that represent features of each $x\in X$. The assumption made here is $X$ contains non-abstract points that have measurable features such as gradient orientation. A non-abstract point has a location and features that can be measured (see § 3 in).

A probe function $\phi: X \rightarrow \mathbb{R}$ represents a feature of a sample point in $X$. The mapping $\Phi: X \longrightarrow \mathbb{R}^n$ is defined by $\Phi(x) = (\phi_1(x), \dots, \phi_n(x))$, where $\mathbb{R}^n$ is an n-dimensional real Euclidean vector space. $\Phi(x)$ is a feature vector for $x$, which provides a description of $x\in X$. For example, this leads to a proximal view of sets of picture points in digital images.

To obtain a descriptive proximity relation (denoted by $\delta_\Phi$), one first chooses a set of probe functions. Let $\mathcal{Q}: 2^X \longrightarrow 2^{R^n}$ be a mapping on a subset of $2^X$ into a subset of $2^{R^n}$. For example, let $A,B\in 2^X$ and $\mathcal{Q}(A),\mathcal{Q}(B)$ denote sets of descriptions of points in $A,B$, respectively. That is,

$$\begin{align}
\mathcal{Q}(A) &= \left\{\Phi(a): a\in A\right\},\\
\mathcal{Q}(B) &= \left\{\Phi(b): b\in B\right\}.
\end{align}$$

The expression $A \mathrel{\delta_\Phi} B$ reads $A$ is descriptively near $B$. Similarly, $A \mathrel{\underline{\delta}_\Phi} B$ reads $A$ is descriptively far from $B$. The descriptive proximity of $A$ and $B$ is defined by

$$A \mathrel{\delta_\Phi} B \Leftrightarrow \mathcal{Q}(\mbox{cl}(A)) \mathrel{\delta} \mathcal{Q}(\mbox{cl}(B)) \neq \emptyset.$$

The descriptive intersection $\mathop{\cap}_\Phi$ of $A$ and $B$ is defined by

$$A \mathbin{\mathop{\cap}_\Phi} B = \left\{x\in A\cup B:\mathcal{Q}(A) \mathrel{\delta} \mathcal{Q}(B)\right\}.$$

That is, $x \in A \cup B$ is in $A \mathbin{\mathop{\cap}_\Phi} B$, provided $\Phi(x) = \Phi(a) = \Phi(b)$ for some $a \in A, b \in B$. Observe that $A$ and $B$ can be disjoint and yet $A \mathbin{\mathop{\cap}_\Phi} B$ can be nonempty.

The descriptive proximity relation $\delta_{\Phi}$ is defined by

$$\delta_\Phi = \left\{(A, B) \in 2^X \times 2^X:
\mbox{cl}(A) \mathbin{\mathop{\cap}_\Phi} \mbox{cl}(B) \neq \emptyset\right\}.$$

Whenever sets $A$ and $B$ have no points with matching descriptions, the sets are descriptively far from each other (denoted by $A\ \underline{\delta}_{\Phi}\ B$).

The binary relation $\delta_\Phi$ is a descriptive EF-proximity, provided the following axioms are satisfied for $A, B, E \subset X$.

dEF.1
If the set $A$ is descriptively close to $B$, then $B$ is descriptively close to $A$.
dEF.2
$A\cup B$ is descriptively close to $E$, if and only if, at least one of the sets $A$ or $B$ is descriptively close to $E$.
dEF.3
Two points $x,y\in X$ are descriptively close, if and only if, the description of $x$ matches the description of $y$.
dEF.4
All nonempty sets are descriptively far from the empty set $\emptyset$.
dEF.5
For any two sets $A$ and $B$ which are descriptively far from each other, there exists $C, D \in 2^X$, $C \cup D = X$, such that $A$ is descriptively far from $C$ and $B$ is descriptively far from $D$ (Descriptive Efremovič axiom).

The pair $(X, \delta_\Phi)$ is called a descriptive proximity space.

== Proximal relator spaces ==
A relator is a nonvoid family of relations $\mathcal{R}$ on a nonempty set $X$. The pair $(X,\mathcal{R})$ (also denoted $X(\mathcal{R})$) is called a relator space. Relator spaces are natural generalizations of ordered sets and uniform spaces. With the introduction of a family of proximity relations $\mathcal{R}_{\delta}$ on $X$, we obtain a proximal relator space $(X,\mathcal{R}_{\delta})$. For simplicity, we consider only two proximity relations, namely, the Efremovič proximity $\delta$ and the descriptive proximity $\delta_{\Phi}$ in defining the descriptive relator $\mathcal{R}_{\delta_{\Phi}}$. The pair $(X,\mathcal{R}_{\delta_{\Phi}})$ is called a proximal relator space. In this work, $X$ denotes a metric topological space that is endowed with the relations in a proximal relator. With the introduction of $(X,\mathcal{R}_{\delta_{\Phi}})$, the traditional closure of a subset (e.g.,) can be compared with the more recent descriptive closure of a subset.

In a proximal relator space $X$, the descriptive closure of a set $A$ (denoted by $\mbox{cl}_{\Phi}(A)$) is defined by

$$\mbox{cl}_{\Phi}(A) = \left\{x\in X: {\Phi(x)} \mathrel{\delta} \mathcal{Q}(\mbox{cl}(A))\right\}.$$

That is, $x\in X$ is in the descriptive closure of $A$, provided the closure of $\Phi(x)$ and the closure of $\mathcal{Q}(\mbox{cl}(A))$ have at least one element in common.

Theorem 2
The descriptive closure of any set $A$ in the descriptive EF-proximity space $(X,\mathcal{R}_{\delta_{\Phi}})$ is the set of points $x\in X$ that are descriptively close to $A$.

Theorem 3
Kuratowski closure of a set $A$ is a subset of the descriptive closure of $A$ in a descriptive EF-proximity space.

Theorem 4
Let $(X,\mathcal{R}_{\delta_{\Phi}})$ be a proximal relator space, $A\subset X$. Then $\mbox{cl}(A)\subseteq \mbox{cl}_{\Phi}(A)$.

Proof
Let $\Phi(x)\in\mathcal{Q}(X\setminus \mbox{cl}(A))$ such that $\Phi(x) = \Phi(a)$ for some $a\in \mbox{cl}A$. Consequently, $\Phi(x)\in\mathcal{Q}(\mbox{cl}_{\Phi}(A))$. Hence, $\mbox{cl}(A)\subseteq \mbox{cl}_{\Phi}(A)$

In a proximal relator space, EF-proximity $\delta$ leads to the following results for descriptive proximity $\delta_{\Phi}$.

Theorem 5
Let $(X,\mathcal{R}_{\delta_{\Phi}})$ be a proximal relator space, $A,B,C\subset X$. Then

1°
$$A\ \delta\ B\ \mbox{implies}\ A\ \delta_{\Phi}\ B$$.
2°
$$(A\cup B)\ \delta\ C\ \mbox{implies}\ (A\cup B)\ \delta_{\Phi}\ C$$.
3°
$$\mbox{cl}A\ \delta\ \mbox{cl}B\ \mbox{implies}\ \mbox{cl}A\ \delta_{\Phi}\ \mbox{cl}B$$.

Proof

1°
$A\ \delta\ B\Leftrightarrow A\cap B\neq \emptyset$. For $x\in A\cap B, \Phi(x)\in \mathcal{Q}(A)$ and $\Phi(x)\in \mathcal{Q}(B)$. Consequently, $A\ \delta_{\Phi}\ B$.
1° ⇒ 2°
3°
$\mbox{cl}A\ \delta\ \mbox{cl}B$ implies that $\mbox{cl}A$ and $\mbox{cl}A$ have at least one point in common. Hence, 1° ⇒ 3°.

$\qquad \blacksquare$

== Descriptive 𝛿-neighbourhoods ==
Figure 6. Example depicting $\delta$-neighbourhoods

In a pseudometric proximal relator space $X$, the neighbourhood of a point $x\in X$ (denoted by $N_{x,\varepsilon}$), for $\varepsilon > 0$, is defined by

$$N_{x,\varepsilon} = \left\{y \in X: d(x, y) < \varepsilon\right\}.$$

The interior of a set $A$ (denoted by $\mbox{int}(A)$) and boundary of $A$ (denoted by $\mbox{bdy}(A)$) in a proximal relator space $X$ are defined by

$$\begin{align}
\mbox{int}(A) &= \left\{x \in X: N_{x,\varepsilon} \subseteq A\right\}. \\
\mbox{bdy}(A) &= \mbox{cl}(A)\setminus\mbox{int}(A).
\end{align}$$

A set $A$ has a natural strong inclusion in a set $B$ associated with $\delta$} (denoted by $A \ll_\delta B$), provided $A \subset \mbox{int}(B)$; i.e., $A \mathrel{\underline{\delta}} X \setminus \mbox{int}(B)$ ($A$ is far from the complement of $\mbox{int}(B)$). Correspondingly, a set $A$ has a descriptive strong inclusion in a set $B$ associated with $\delta_\Phi$ (denoted by $A \mathrel{\mathop{\ll}_\Phi} B$), provided $\mathcal{Q}(A)\subset\ \mathcal{Q}(\mbox{int}(B))$; i.e., $A\ \underline{\delta}_{\Phi}\ X\setminus \mbox{int}(B)$ ($\mathcal{Q}(A)$ is far from the complement of $\mbox{int}B$).

Let $\mathop{\ll}_\Phi$ be a descriptive $\delta$-neighbourhood relation defined by

$$\mathop{\ll}_{\Phi} = \left\{(A, B) \in 2^X \times 2^X: \mathcal{Q}(A)\subset \mathcal{Q}(\mbox{int}(B))\right\}.$$

That is, $A \mathrel{\mathop{\ll}_\Phi} B$, provided the description of each $a \in A$ is contained in the set of descriptions of the points $b\in \mbox{int}(B)$. Now observe that any $A, B$ in the proximal relator space $X$ such that $A \mathrel{\underline{\delta}_\Phi} B$ have disjoint $\delta_\Phi$-neighbourhoods; i.e.,

$$A \mathrel{\underline{\delta}_\Phi} B \Leftrightarrow A \mathrel{\mathop{\ll}_\Phi} E1, B \mathrel{\mathop{\ll}_\Phi} E2,\ \mbox{for some}\ E1, E2 \subset X\ \mbox{(See Fig. 6).}$$

Theorem 6
Any two sets descriptively far from each other belong to disjoint descriptive $\delta_\Phi$-neighbourhoods in a descriptive proximity space $X$.

A consideration of strong containment of a nonempty set in another set leads to the study of hit-and-miss topologies and the Wijsman topology.

== Tolerance near sets ==
Let $\varepsilon$ be a real number greater than zero. In the study of sets that are proximally near within some tolerance, the set of proximity relations $\mathcal{R}_{\delta_\Phi}$ is augmented with a pseudometric tolerance proximity relation (denoted by $\delta_{\Phi,\varepsilon}$) defined by

$$\begin{align}
D_\Phi(A, B) &= \inf\left\{d(\Phi(a), \Phi(a)): \Phi(a) \in \mathcal{Q}(A), \Phi(a) \in \mathcal{Q}(B)\right\},\\
d(\Phi(a), \Phi(a)) &= \mathop{\sum}_{i=1}^n |\phi_i(a) - \phi_i(b)|,\\
\delta_{\Phi,\varepsilon} &= \left\{(A, B) \in 2^X \times 2^X: |D(\mbox{cl}(A), \mbox{cl}(B))| < \varepsilon\right\}.
\end{align}$$

Let $\mathcal{R}_{\delta_{\Phi,\varepsilon}} = \mathcal{R}_{\delta_\Phi}\cup\left\{\delta_{\Phi,\varepsilon}\right\}$. In other words, a nonempty set equipped with the proximal relator $\mathcal{R}_{\delta_{\Phi,\varepsilon}}$ has underlying structure provided by the proximal relator $\mathcal{R}_{\delta_\Phi}$ and provides a basis for the study of tolerance near sets in $X$ that are near within some tolerance. Sets $A, B$ in a descriptive pseudometric proximal relator space $(X, \mathcal{R}_{\delta_{\Phi,\varepsilon}})$ are tolerance near sets (i.e., $A\ \delta_{\Phi,\varepsilon}\ B$), provided

$$D_{\Phi}(A, B) < \varepsilon.$$

== Tolerance classes and preclasses ==
Relations with the same formal properties as similarity relations of sensations considered by Poincaré are nowadays, after Zeeman, called tolerance relations. A tolerance $\tau$ on a set $O$ is a relation $\tau \subseteq O \times O$ that is reflexive and symmetric. In algebra, the term tolerance relation is also used in a narrow sense to denote reflexive and symmetric relations defined on universes of algebras that are also compatible with operations of a given algebra, i.e., they are generalizations of congruence relations (see e.g.,). In referring to such relations, the term algebraic tolerance or the term algebraic tolerance relation is used. Transitive tolerance relations are equivalence relations. A set $O$ together with a tolerance $\tau$ is called a tolerance space (denoted $(O, \tau)$). A set $A \subseteq O$ is a $\tau$-preclass (or briefly preclass when $\tau$ is understood) if and only if for any $x,y \in A$, $(x,y) \in \tau$.

The family of all preclasses of a tolerance space is naturally ordered by set inclusion and preclasses that are maximal with respect to set inclusion are called $\tau$-classes or just classes, when $\tau$ is understood. The family of all classes of the space $(O, \tau)$ is particularly interesting and is denoted by $H_{\tau}(O)$. The family $H_{\tau}(O)$ is a covering of $O$.

The work on similarity by Poincaré and Zeeman presage the introduction of near sets and research on similarity relations, e.g.,. In science and engineering, tolerance near sets are a practical application of the study of sets that are near within some tolerance. A tolerance $\varepsilon\in(0,\infty]$ is directly related to the idea of closeness or resemblance (i.e., being within some tolerance) in comparing objects. By way of application of Poincaré's approach in defining visual spaces and Zeeman's approach to tolerance relations, the basic idea is to compare objects such as image patches in the interior of digital images.

=== Examples ===
Simple example

The following simple example demonstrates the construction of tolerance classes from real data. Consider the 20 objects in the table below with $|\Phi| = 1$.

Sample perceptual system
$x_i$	$\phi(x)$	$x_i$	$\phi(x)$	$x_i$	$\phi(x)$	$x_i$	$\phi(x)$
$x_1$	.4518	$x_6$	.6943	$x_{11}$	.4002	$x_{16}$	.6079
$x_2$	.9166	$x_7$	.9246	$x_{12}$	.1910	$x_{17}$	.1869
$x_3$	.1398	$x_8$	.3537	$x_{13}$	.7476	$x_{18}$	.8489
$x_4$	.7972	$x_9$	.4722	$x_{14}$	.4990	$x_{19}$	.9170
$x_5$	.6281	$x_{10}$	.4523	$x_{15}$	.6289	$x_{20}$	.7143

Let a tolerance relation be defined as

$$\cong_{\varepsilon} {}\Leftrightarrow \{(x,y) \in O \times O :\; \parallel\Phi(x) - \Phi(y)\parallel_{_2} \leq \varepsilon\}$$

Then, setting $\varepsilon = 0.1$ gives the following tolerance classes:

$$\begin{align}
H_{\cong_{\varepsilon}}(O) ={}
& \{ \{x_1, x_8, x_{10}, x_{11}\},\{x_1, x_9, x_{10}, x_{11}, x_{14}\},\\
& \{x_2, x_7, x_{18}, x_{19}\},\\
& \{x_3, x_{12}, x_{17}\},\\
& \{x_4, x_{13}, x_{20}\},\{x_4, x_{18}\},\\
& \{x_5, x_6, x_{15}, x_{16}\},\{x_5, x_6, x_{15}, x_{20}\},\\
& \{x_6, x_{13}, x_{20}\}\}.
\end{align}$$

Observe that each object in a tolerance class satisfies the condition $\parallel\Phi(x) -\Phi(y)\parallel_2\leq\varepsilon$, and that almost all of the objects appear in more than one class. Moreover, there would be twenty classes if the indiscernibility relation was used since there are no two objects with matching descriptions.

Image processing example

Figure 7. Example of images that are near each other. (a) and (b) Images from the freely available LeavesDataset (see, e.g., www.vision.caltech.edu/archive.html).

The following example provides an example based on digital images. Let a subimage be defined as a small subset of pixels belonging to a digital image such that the pixels contained in the subimage form a square. Then, let the sets $X$ and $Y$ respectively represent the subimages obtained from two different images, and let $O = \{X \cup Y\}$. Finally, let the description of an object be given by the Green component in the RGB color model. The next step is to find all the tolerance classes using the tolerance relation defined in the previous example. Using this information, tolerance classes can be formed containing objects that have similar (within some small $\varepsilon$) values for the Green component in the RGB colour model. Furthermore, images that are near (similar) to each other should have tolerance classes divided among both images (instead of a tolerance classes contained solely in one of the images). For example, the figure accompanying this example shows a subset of the tolerance classes obtained from two leaf images. In this figure, each tolerance class is assigned a separate colour. As can be seen, the two leaves share similar tolerance classes. This example highlights a need to measure the degree of nearness of two sets.

== Nearness measure ==
Let $(U,\mathcal{R}_{\delta_{\Phi,\varepsilon}})$ denote a particular descriptive pseudometric EF-proximal relator space equipped with the proximity relation $\delta_{\Phi,\varepsilon}$ and with nonempty subsets $X,Y\in 2^U$ and with the tolerance relation $\cong_{\Phi,\varepsilon}$ defined in terms of a set of probes $\Phi$ and with $\varepsilon\in (0,\infty]$, where

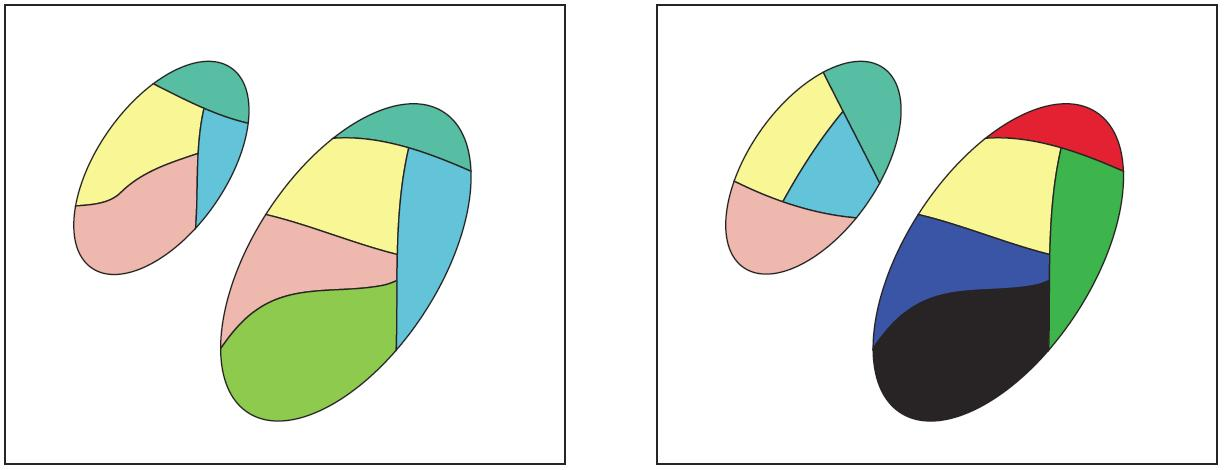
Figure 8. Examples of degree of nearness between two sets: (a) High degree of nearness, and (b) Low degree of nearness.

$$\simeq_{\Phi,\varepsilon} = \{(x, y)\in U\times U\mid\ |\Phi(x) - \Phi(y)| \leq\varepsilon\}.$$

Further, assume $Z = X\cup Y$ and let $H_{\tau_{\Phi,\varepsilon}}(Z)$ denote the family of all classes in the space $(Z, \simeq_{\Phi,\varepsilon})$.

Let $A\subseteq X, B\subseteq Y$. The distance $D_{_{tNM}}:2^U\times 2^U:\longrightarrow [0,\infty]$ is defined by

$$D_{_{tNM}}(X,Y) =
\begin{cases}
1-tNM(A,B), &\mbox{if }X\mbox{ and }Y\mbox{ are not empty},\\
\infty,&\mbox{if }X\mbox{ or }Y\mbox{ is empty},
\end{cases}$$

where

$$tNM(A, B) = \Biggl(\sum_{C\in H_{\tau_{\Phi,\varepsilon}}(Z)} |C|\Biggr)^{-1} \cdot \sum_{C\in H_{\tau_{\Phi,\varepsilon}}(Z)} |C| \frac{ \min (|C\cap A |,|[C\cap B|)}{\max (|C\cap A |,|C\cap B|)}.$$

The details concerning $tNM$ are given in. The idea behind $tNM$ is that sets that are similar should have a similar number of objects in each tolerance class. Thus, for each tolerance class obtained from the covering of $Z=X\cup Y$, $tNM$ counts the number of objects that belong to $X$ and $Y$ and takes the ratio (as a proper fraction) of their cardinalities. Furthermore, each ratio is weighted by the total size of the tolerance class (thus giving importance to the larger classes) and the final result is normalized by dividing by the sum of all the cardinalities. The range of $tNM$ is in the interval [0,1], where a value of 1 is obtained if the sets are equivalent (based on object descriptions) and a value of 0 is obtained if they have no descriptions in common.

As an example of the degree of nearness between two sets, consider figure below in which each image consists of two sets of objects, $X$ and $Y$. Each colour in the figures corresponds to a set where all the objects in the class share the same description. The idea behind $tNM$ is that the nearness of sets in a perceptual system is based on the cardinality of tolerance classes that they share. Thus, the sets in left side of the figure are closer (more near) to each other in terms of their descriptions than the sets in right side of the figure.

== Near set evaluation and recognition (NEAR) system ==
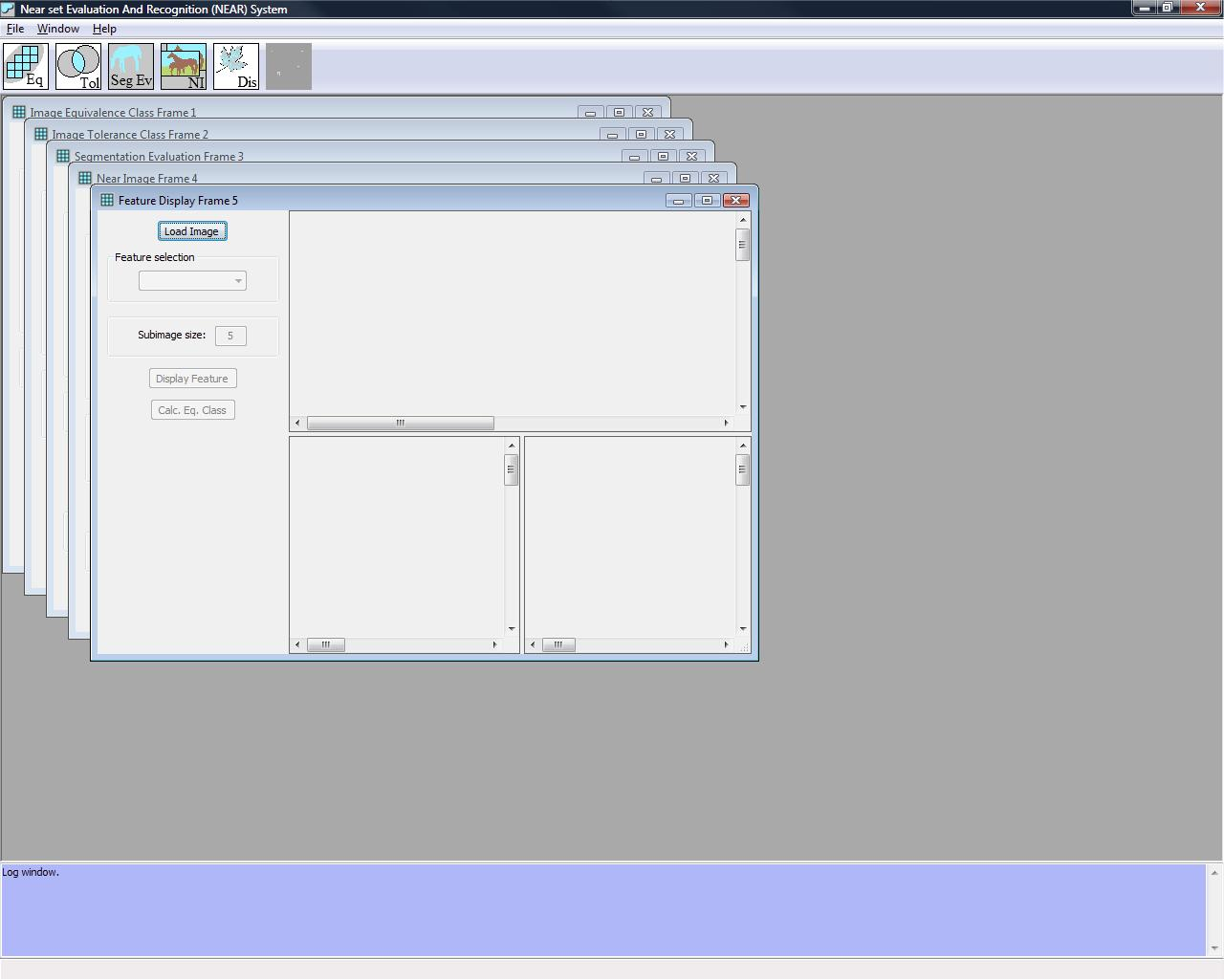
Figure 9. NEAR system GUI.

The Near set Evaluation and Recognition (NEAR) system, is a system developed to demonstrate practical applications of near set theory to the problems of image segmentation evaluation and image correspondence. It was motivated by a need for a freely available software tool that can provide results for research and to generate interest in near set theory. The system implements a Multiple Document Interface (MDI) where each separate processing task is performed in its own child frame. The objects (in the near set sense) in this system are subimages of the images being processed and the probe functions (features) are image processing functions defined on the subimages. The system was written in C++ and was designed to facilitate the addition of new processing tasks and probe functions. Currently, the system performs six major tasks, namely, displaying equivalence and tolerance classes for an image, performing segmentation evaluation, measuring the nearness of two images, performing Content Based Image Retrieval (CBIR), and displaying the output of processing an image using a specific probe function.

== Proximity System ==
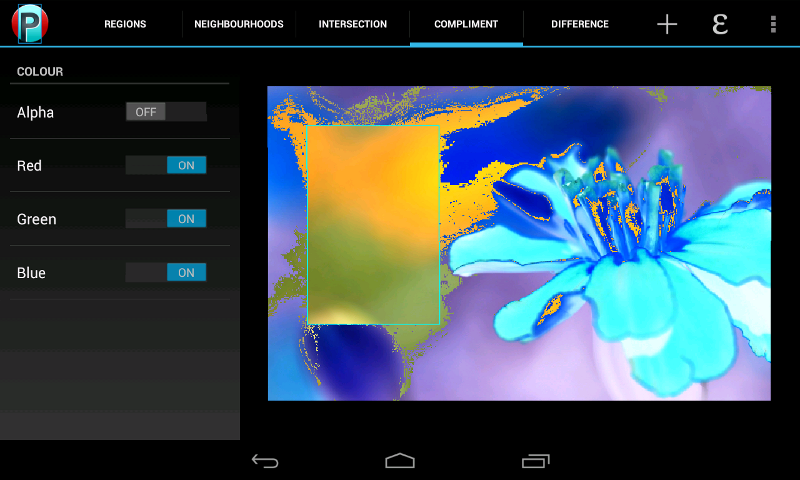
Figure 10. The Proximity System.

The Proximity System is an application developed to demonstrate descriptive-based topological approaches to nearness and proximity within the context of digital image analysis. The Proximity System grew out of the work of S. Naimpally and J. Peters on Topological Spaces. The Proximity System was written in Java and is intended to run in two different operating environments, namely on Android smartphones and tablets, as well as desktop platforms running the Java Virtual Machine. With respect to the desktop environment, the Proximity System is a cross-platform Java application for Windows, OSX, and Linux systems, which has been tested on Windows 7 and Debian Linux using the Sun Java 6 Runtime. In terms of the implementation of the theoretical approaches, both the Android and the desktop based applications use the same back-end libraries to perform the description-based calculations, where the only differences are the user interface and the Android version has less available features due to restrictions on system resources.

== See also ==
- Alternative set theory
- Category:Mathematical relations
- Category:Topology
- Feature vector
- Proximity space
- Rough set
- Topology

== Notes ==
1. J.R. Isbell observed that the notions near and far are important in a uniform space. Sets $A,B$ are far (uniformaly distal), provided the $\{A,B\}$ is a discrete collection. A nonempty set $U$ is a uniform neighbourhood of a set $A$, provided the complement of $U$ is far from $U$. See, §33 in
2. The intuition that led to the discovery of descriptively near sets is given in Pawlak, Z.;Peters, J.F. (2002, 2007) "Jak blisko (How Near)". Systemy Wspomagania Decyzji I 57 (109)
3. Descriptively near sets are introduced in. The connections between traditional EF-proximity and descriptive EF-proximity are explored in.
4. Reminiscent of M. Pavel's approach, descriptions of members of sets objects are defined relative to vectors of values obtained from real-valued functions called probes. See, Pavel, M. (1993). Fundamentals of pattern recognition. 2nd ed. New York: Marcel Dekker, for the introduction of probe functions considered in the context of image registration.
5. A non-spatial view of near sets appears in, C.J. Mozzochi, M.S. Gagrat, and S.A. Naimpally, Symmetric generalized topological structures, Exposition Press, Hicksville, NY, 1976., and, more recently, nearness of disjoint sets $X$ and $Y$ based on resemblance between pairs of elements $x\in X, y\in Y$ (i.e. $x$ and $y$ have similar feature vectors $\boldsymbol{\phi(x)},\boldsymbol{\phi(y)}$ and the norm $\parallel\boldsymbol{\phi(x)} - \boldsymbol{\phi(y)}\parallel_{_p} < \varepsilon$) See, e.g.,.
6. The basic facts about closure of a set were first pointed out by M. Fréchet in, and elaborated by B. Knaster and C. Kuratowski in.
7. Observe that up to the 1970s, proximity meant EF-proximity, since this is the one that was studied intensively. The pre-1970 work on proximity spaces is exemplified by the series of papers by J. M. Smirnov during the first half of the 1950s, culminating in the compendious collection of results by S.A. Naimpally and B.D. Warrack. But in view of later developments, there is a need to distinguish between various proximities. A basic proximity or Čech-proximity was introduced by E. Čech during the late 1930s (see §25 A.1, pp. 439-440 in). The conditions for the non-symmetric case for a proximity were introduced by S. Leader and for the symmetric case by M.W. Lodato.
