= Pretopology =

In mathematics, pretopology may refer to

- A concept in convergence space theory. See pretopological space.
- Grothendieck pretopology in the context of a Grothendieck topology.
