= Closeness =

Closeness may refer to:

- closeness (mathematics)
- closeness (graph theory), the shortest path between one vertex and another vertex
- the personal distance between two people in proxemics
- Social connectedness
- Closeness (album), a 1976 album by Charlie Haden
- Closeness (film), a 2017 Russian film
- vowel height
