= Convex series =

In mathematics, particularly in functional analysis and convex analysis, a convex series is a series of the form $\sum_{i=1}^{\infty} r_i x_i$ where $x_1, x_2, \ldots$ are all elements of a topological vector space $X$, and all $r_1, r_2, \ldots$ are non-negative real numbers that sum to $1$ (that is, such that $\sum_{i=1}^{\infty} r_i = 1$).

== Types of Convex series ==
Suppose that $S$ is a subset of $X$ and $\sum_{i=1}^{\infty} r_i x_i$ is a convex series in $X.$

- If all $x_1, x_2, \ldots$ belong to $S$ then the convex series $\sum_{i=1}^{\infty} r_i x_i$ is called a convex series with elements of $S$.
- If the set $\left\{ x_1, x_2, \ldots \right\}$ is a (von Neumann) bounded set then the series called a b-convex series.
- The convex series $\sum_{i=1}^{\infty} r_i x_i$ is said to be a convergent series if the sequence of partial sums $\left(\sum_{i=1}^n r_i x_i\right)_{n=1}^{\infty}$ converges in $X$ to some element of $X,$ which is called the sum of the convex series.
- The convex series is called Cauchy if $\sum_{i=1}^{\infty} r_i x_i$ is a Cauchy series, which by definition means that the sequence of partial sums $\left(\sum_{i=1}^n r_i x_i\right)_{n=1}^{\infty}$ is a Cauchy sequence.

== Types of subsets ==
Convex series allow for the definition of special types of subsets that are well-behaved and useful with very good stability properties.

If $S$ is a subset of a topological vector space $X$ then $S$ is said to be a:

- cs-closed set if any convergent convex series with elements of $S$ has its (each) sum in $S.$
  - In this definition, $X$ is not required to be Hausdorff, in which case the sum may not be unique. In any such case we require that every sum belong to $S.$
- lower cs-closed set or a lcs-closed set if there exists a Fréchet space $Y$ such that $S$ is equal to the projection onto $X$ (via the canonical projection) of some cs-closed subset $B$ of $X \times Y$ Every cs-closed set is lower cs-closed and every lower cs-closed set is lower ideally convex and convex (the converses are not true in general).
- ideally convex set if any convergent b-series with elements of $S$ has its sum in $S.$
- lower ideally convex set or a li-convex set if there exists a Fréchet space $Y$ such that $S$ is equal to the projection onto $X$ (via the canonical projection) of some ideally convex subset $B$ of $X \times Y.$ Every ideally convex set is lower ideally convex. Every lower ideally convex set is convex but the converse is in general not true.
- cs-complete set if any Cauchy convex series with elements of $S$ is convergent and its sum is in $S.$
- bcs-complete set if any Cauchy b-convex series with elements of $S$ is convergent and its sum is in $S.$

The empty set is convex, ideally convex, bcs-complete, cs-complete, and cs-closed.

=== Conditions (Hx) and (Hwx) ===
If $X$ and $Y$ are topological vector spaces, $A$ is a subset of $X \times Y,$ and $x \in X$ then $A$ is said to satisfy:

- Condition (Hx): Whenever $\sum_{i=1}^{\infty} r_i (x_i, y_i)$ is a convex series with elements of $A$ such that $\sum_{i=1}^{\infty} r_i y_i$ is convergent in $Y$ with sum $y$ and $\sum_{i=1}^{\infty} r_i x_i$ is Cauchy, then $\sum_{i=1}^{\infty} r_i x_i$ is convergent in $X$ and its sum $x$ is such that $(x, y) \in A.$
- Condition (Hwx): Whenever $\sum_{i=1}^{\infty} r_i (x_i, y_i)$ is a b-convex series with elements of $A$ such that $\sum_{i=1}^{\infty} r_i y_i$ is convergent in $Y$ with sum $y$ and $\sum_{i=1}^{\infty} r_i x_i$ is Cauchy, then $\sum_{i=1}^{\infty} r_i x_i$ is convergent in $X$ and its sum $x$ is such that $(x, y) \in A.$
  - If X is locally convex then the statement "and $\sum_{i=1}^{\infty} r_i x_i$ is Cauchy" may be removed from the definition of condition (Hwx).

== Multifunctions ==
The following notation and notions are used, where $\mathcal{R} : X \rightrightarrows Y$ and $\mathcal{S} : Y \rightrightarrows Z$ are multifunctions and $S \subseteq X$ is a non-empty subset of a topological vector space $X:$

- The graph of a multifunction of $\mathcal{R}$ is the set $\operatorname{gr} \mathcal{R} := \{ (x, y) \in X \times Y : y \in \mathcal{R}(x) \}.$
- $\mathcal{R}$ is closed (respectively, cs-closed, lower cs-closed, convex, ideally convex, lower ideally convex, cs-complete, bcs-complete) if the same is true of the graph of $\mathcal{R}$ in $X \times Y.$
  - The multifunction $\mathcal{R}$ is convex if and only if for all $x_0, x_1 \in X$ and all $r \in [0, 1],$ $r \mathcal{R}\left(x_0\right) + (1 - r) \mathcal{R}\left(x_1\right) \subseteq \mathcal{R} \left(r x_0 + (1 - r) x_1\right).$
- The inverse of a multifunction $\mathcal{R}$ is the multifunction $\mathcal{R}^{-1} : Y \rightrightarrows X$ defined by $\mathcal{R}^{-1}(y) := \left\{ x \in X : y \in \mathcal{R}(x) \right\}.$ For any subset $B \subseteq Y,$ $\mathcal{R}^{-1}(B) := \cup_{y \in B} \mathcal{R}^{-1}(y).$
- The domain of a multifunction $\mathcal{R}$ is $\operatorname{Dom} \mathcal{R} := \left\{ x \in X : \mathcal{R}(x) \neq \emptyset \right\}.$
- The image of a multifunction $\mathcal{R}$ is $\operatorname{Im} \mathcal{R} := \cup_{x \in X} \mathcal{R}(x).$ For any subset $A \subseteq X,$ $\mathcal{R}(A) := \cup_{x \in A} \mathcal{R}(x).$
- The composition $\mathcal{S} \circ \mathcal{R} : X \rightrightarrows Z$ is defined by $\left(\mathcal{S} \circ \mathcal{R}\right)(x) := \cup_{y \in \mathcal{R}(x)} \mathcal{S}(y)$ for each $x \in X.$

== Relationships ==
Let $X, Y, \text{ and } Z$ be topological vector spaces, $S \subseteq X, T \subseteq Y,$ and $A \subseteq X \times Y.$ The following implications hold:

complete $\implies$ cs-complete $\implies$ cs-closed $\implies$ lower cs-closed (lcs-closed) and ideally convex.
lower cs-closed (lcs-closed) or ideally convex $\implies$ lower ideally convex (li-convex) $\implies$ convex.
(Hx) $\implies$ (Hwx) $\implies$ convex.

The converse implications do not hold in general.

If $X$ is complete then,

1. $S$ is cs-complete (respectively, bcs-complete) if and only if $S$ is cs-closed (respectively, ideally convex).
2. $A$ satisfies (Hx) if and only if $A$ is cs-closed.
3. $A$ satisfies (Hwx) if and only if $A$ is ideally convex.

If $Y$ is complete then,

1. $A$ satisfies (Hx) if and only if $A$ is cs-complete.
2. $A$ satisfies (Hwx) if and only if $A$ is bcs-complete.
3. If $B \subseteq X \times Y \times Z$ and $y \in Y$ then:
  1. $B$ satisfies (H(x, y)) if and only if $B$ satisfies (Hx).
  2. $B$ satisfies (Hw(x, y)) if and only if $B$ satisfies (Hwx).

If $X$ is locally convex and $\operatorname{Pr}_X (A)$ is bounded then,

1. If $A$ satisfies (Hx) then $\operatorname{Pr}_X (A)$ is cs-closed.
2. If $A$ satisfies (Hwx) then $\operatorname{Pr}_X (A)$ is ideally convex.

=== Preserved properties ===
Let $X_0$ be a linear subspace of $X.$ Let $\mathcal{R} : X \rightrightarrows Y$ and $\mathcal{S} : Y \rightrightarrows Z$ be multifunctions.

- If $S$ is a cs-closed (resp. ideally convex) subset of $X$ then $X_0 \cap S$ is also a cs-closed (resp. ideally convex) subset of $X_0.$
- If $X$ is first countable then $X_0$ is cs-closed (resp. cs-complete) if and only if $X_0$ is closed (resp. complete); moreover, if $X$ is locally convex then $X_0$ is closed if and only if $X_0$ is ideally convex.
- $S \times T$ is cs-closed (resp. cs-complete, ideally convex, bcs-complete) in $X \times Y$ if and only if the same is true of both $S$ in $X$ and of $T$ in $Y.$
- The properties of being cs-closed, lower cs-closed, ideally convex, lower ideally convex, cs-complete, and bcs-complete are all preserved under isomorphisms of topological vector spaces.
- The intersection of arbitrarily many cs-closed (resp. ideally convex) subsets of $X$ has the same property.
- The Cartesian product of cs-closed (resp. ideally convex) subsets of arbitrarily many topological vector spaces has that same property (in the product space endowed with the product topology).
- The intersection of countably many lower ideally convex (resp. lower cs-closed) subsets of $X$ has the same property.
- The Cartesian product of lower ideally convex (resp. lower cs-closed) subsets of countably many topological vector spaces has that same property (in the product space endowed with the product topology).
- Suppose $X$ is a Fréchet space and the $A$ and $B$ are subsets. If $A$ and $B$ are lower ideally convex (resp. lower cs-closed) then so is $A + B.$
- Suppose $X$ is a Fréchet space and $A$ is a subset of $X.$ If $A$ and $\mathcal{R} : X \rightrightarrows Y$ are lower ideally convex (resp. lower cs-closed) then so is $\mathcal{R}(A).$
- Suppose $Y$ is a Fréchet space and $\mathcal{R}_2 : X \rightrightarrows Y$ is a multifunction. If $\mathcal{R}, \mathcal{R}_2, \mathcal{S}$ are all lower ideally convex (resp. lower cs-closed) then so are $\mathcal{R} + \mathcal{R}_2 : X \rightrightarrows Y$ and $\mathcal{S} \circ \mathcal{R} : X \rightrightarrows Z.$

== Properties ==
If $S$ be a non-empty convex subset of a topological vector space $X$ then,

1. If $S$ is closed or open then $S$ is cs-closed.
2. If $X$ is Hausdorff and finite dimensional then $S$ is cs-closed.
3. If $X$ is first countable and $S$ is ideally convex then $\operatorname{int} S = \operatorname{int} \left(\operatorname{cl} S\right).$

Let $X$ be a Fréchet space, $Y$ be a topological vector spaces, $A \subseteq X \times Y,$ and $\operatorname{Pr}_Y : X \times Y \to Y$ be the canonical projection. If $A$ is lower ideally convex (resp. lower cs-closed) then the same is true of $\operatorname{Pr}_Y (A).$

If $X$ is a barreled first countable space and if $C \subseteq X$ then:

1. If $C$ is lower ideally convex then $C^i = \operatorname{int} C,$ where $C^i := \operatorname{aint}_X C$ denotes the algebraic interior of $C$ in $X.$
2. If $C$ is ideally convex then $C^i = \operatorname{int} C = \operatorname{int} \left(\operatorname{cl} C\right) = \left(\operatorname{cl} C\right)^i.$

== See also ==
- Ursescu theorem – Generalization of closed graph, open mapping, and uniform boundedness theorem
