= Ursescu theorem =

Generalization of closed graph, open mapping, and uniform boundedness theorem

In mathematics, particularly in functional analysis and convex analysis, the Ursescu theorem is a theorem that generalizes the closed graph theorem, the open mapping theorem, and the uniform boundedness principle.

== Ursescu theorem ==
The following notation and notions are used, where $\mathcal{R} : X \rightrightarrows Y$ is a set-valued function and $S$ is a non-empty subset of a topological vector space $X$:

- the affine span of $S$ is denoted by $\operatorname{aff} S$ and the linear span is denoted by $\operatorname{span} S.$
- $S^{i} := \operatorname{aint}_X S$ denotes the algebraic interior of $S$ in $X.$
- ${}^{i}S:= \operatorname{aint}_{\operatorname{aff}(S - S)} S$ denotes the relative algebraic interior of $S$ (i.e. the algebraic interior of $S$ in $\operatorname{aff}(S - S)$).
- ${}^{ib}S := {}^{i}S$ if $\operatorname{span} \left(S - s_0\right)$ is barreled for some/every $s_0 \in S$ while ${}^{ib}S := \varnothing$ otherwise.
  - If $S$ is convex then it can be shown that for any $x \in X,$ $x \in {}^{ib} S$ if and only if the cone generated by $S - x$ is a barreled linear subspace of $X$ or equivalently, if and only if $\cup_{n \in \N} n (S - x)$ is a barreled linear subspace of $X$
- The domain of $\mathcal{R}$ is $\operatorname{Dom} \mathcal{R} := \{ x \in X : \mathcal{R}(x) \neq \varnothing \}.$
- The image of $\mathcal{R}$ is $\operatorname{Im} \mathcal{R} := \cup_{x \in X} \mathcal{R}(x).$ For any subset $A \subseteq X,$ $\mathcal{R}(A) := \cup_{x \in A} \mathcal{R}(x).$
- The graph of $\mathcal{R}$ is $\operatorname{gr} \mathcal{R} := \{ (x, y) \in X \times Y : y \in \mathcal{R}(x) \}.$
- $\mathcal{R}$ is closed (respectively, convex) if the graph of $\mathcal{R}$ is closed (resp. convex) in $X \times Y.$
  - Note that $\mathcal{R}$ is convex if and only if for all $x_0, x_1 \in X$ and all $r \in [0, 1],$ $r \mathcal{R}\left(x_0\right) + (1 - r) \mathcal{R}\left(x_1\right) \subseteq \mathcal{R} \left(r x_0 + (1 - r) x_1\right).$
- The inverse of $\mathcal{R}$ is the set-valued function $\mathcal{R}^{-1} : Y \rightrightarrows X$ defined by $\mathcal{R}^{-1}(y) := \{ x \in X : y \in \mathcal{R}(x) \}.$ For any subset $B \subseteq Y,$ $\mathcal{R}^{-1}(B) := \cup_{y \in B} \mathcal{R}^{-1}(y).$
  - If $f : X \to Y$ is a function, then its inverse is the set-valued function $f^{-1} : Y \rightrightarrows X$ obtained from canonically identifying $f$ with the set-valued function $f : X \rightrightarrows Y$ defined by $x \mapsto \{ f(x)\}.$
- $\operatorname{int}_T S$ is the topological interior of $S$ with respect to $T,$ where $S \subseteq T.$
- $\operatorname{rint} S := \operatorname{int}_{\operatorname{aff} S} S$ is the interior of $S$ with respect to $\operatorname{aff} S.$

=== Statement ===
Theorem (Ursescu)—Let $X$ be a complete semi-metrizable locally convex topological vector space and $\mathcal{R} : X \rightrightarrows Y$ be a closed convex multifunction with non-empty domain. Assume that $\operatorname{span} (\operatorname{Im} \mathcal{R} - y)$ is a barrelled space for some/every $y \in \operatorname{Im} \mathcal{R}.$ Assume that $y_0 \in {}^{i}(\operatorname{Im} \mathcal{R})$ and let $x_0 \in \mathcal{R}^{-1}\left(y_0\right)$ (so that $y_0 \in \mathcal{R}\left(x_0\right)$). Then for every neighborhood $U$ of $x_0$ in $X,$ $y_0$ belongs to the relative interior of $\mathcal{R}(U)$ in $\operatorname{aff} (\operatorname{Im} \mathcal{R})$ (that is, $y_0 \in \operatorname{int}_{\operatorname{aff} (\operatorname{Im} \mathcal{R})} \mathcal{R}(U)$). In particular, if ${}^{ib}(\operatorname{Im} \mathcal{R}) \neq \varnothing$ then ${}^{ib}(\operatorname{Im} \mathcal{R}) = {}^{i}(\operatorname{Im} \mathcal{R}) = \operatorname{rint} (\operatorname{Im} \mathcal{R}).$

== Corollaries ==
=== Closed graph theorem ===
Closed graph theorem—Let $X$ and $Y$ be Fréchet spaces and $T : X \to Y$ be a linear map. Then $T$ is continuous if and only if the graph of $T$ is closed in $X \times Y.$

Proof

For the non-trivial direction, assume that the graph of $T$ is closed and let $\mathcal{R} := T^{-1} : Y \rightrightarrows X.$ It is easy to see that $\operatorname{gr} \mathcal{R}$ is closed and convex and that its image is $X.$ Given $x \in X,$ $(Tx, x)$ belongs to $Y \times X$ so that for every open neighborhood $V$ of $Tx$ in $Y,$ $\mathcal{R}(V) = T^{-1}(V)$ is a neighborhood of $x$ in $X.$ Thus $T$ is continuous at $x.$ Q.E.D.

=== Uniform boundedness principle ===
Uniform boundedness principle—Let $X$ and $Y$ be Fréchet spaces and $T : X \to Y$ be a bijective linear map. Then $T$ is continuous if and only if $T^{-1} : Y \to X$ is continuous. Furthermore, if $T$ is continuous then $T$ is an isomorphism of Fréchet spaces.

Proof

Apply the closed graph theorem to $T$ and $T^{-1}.$ Q.E.D.

=== Open mapping theorem ===
Open mapping theorem—Let $X$ and $Y$ be Fréchet spaces and $T : X \to Y$ be a continuous surjective linear map. Then T is an open map.

Proof

Clearly, $T$ is a closed and convex relation whose image is $Y.$ Let $U$ be a non-empty open subset of $X,$ let $y$ be in $T(U),$ and let $x$ in $U$ be such that $y = Tx.$ From the Ursescu theorem it follows that $T(U)$ is a neighborhood of $y.$ Q.E.D.

=== Additional corollaries ===
The following notation and notions are used for these corollaries, where $\mathcal{R} : X \rightrightarrows Y$ is a set-valued function, $S$ is a non-empty subset of a topological vector space $X$:

- a convex series with elements of $S$ is a series of the form $\sum_{i=1}^\infty r_i s_i$ where all $s_i \in S$ and $\sum_{i=1}^\infty r_i = 1$ is a series of non-negative numbers. If $\sum_{i=1}^\infty r_i s_i$ converges then the series is called convergent while if $\left(s_i\right)_{i=1}^{\infty}$ is bounded then the series is called bounded and b-convex.
- $S$ is ideally convex if any convergent b-convex series of elements of $S$ has its sum in $S.$
- $S$ is lower ideally convex if there exists a Fréchet space $Y$ such that $S$ is equal to the projection onto $X$ of some ideally convex subset B of $X \times Y.$ Every ideally convex set is lower ideally convex.

Corollary—Let $X$ be a barreled first countable space and let $C$ be a subset of $X.$ Then:

1. If $C$ is lower ideally convex then $C^{i} = \operatorname{int} C.$
2. If $C$ is ideally convex then $C^{i} = \operatorname{int} C = \operatorname{int} \left(\operatorname{cl} C\right) = \left(\operatorname{cl} C\right)^i.$

== Related theorems ==
=== Simons' theorem ===
Simons' theorem—Let $X$ and $Y$ be first countable with $X$ locally convex. Suppose that $\mathcal{R} : X \rightrightarrows Y$ is a multimap with non-empty domain that satisfies condition (Hwx) or else assume that $X$ is a Fréchet space and that $\mathcal{R}$ is lower ideally convex. Assume that $\operatorname{span} (\operatorname{Im} \mathcal{R} - y)$ is barreled for some/every $y \in \operatorname{Im} \mathcal{R}.$ Assume that $y_0 \in {}^{i}(\operatorname{Im} \mathcal{R})$ and let $x_0 \in \mathcal{R}^{-1}\left(y_0\right).$ Then for every neighborhood $U$ of $x_0$ in $X,$ $y_0$ belongs to the relative interior of $\mathcal{R}(U)$ in $\operatorname{aff} (\operatorname{Im} \mathcal{R})$ (i.e. $y_0 \in \operatorname{int}_{\operatorname{aff} (\operatorname{Im} \mathcal{R})} \mathcal{R}(U)$). In particular, if ${}^{ib}(\operatorname{Im} \mathcal{R}) \neq \varnothing$ then ${}^{ib}(\operatorname{Im} \mathcal{R}) = {}^{i}(\operatorname{Im} \mathcal{R}) = \operatorname{rint} (\operatorname{Im} \mathcal{R}).$

=== Robinson–Ursescu theorem ===
The implication (1) $\implies$ (2) in the following theorem is known as the Robinson–Ursescu theorem.

Robinson–Ursescu theorem—Let $(X, \|\,\cdot\,\|)$ and $(Y, \|\,\cdot\,\|)$ be normed spaces and $\mathcal{R} : X \rightrightarrows Y$ be a multimap with non-empty domain. Suppose that $Y$ is a barreled space, the graph of $\mathcal{R}$ verifies condition condition (Hwx), and that $(x_0, y_0) \in \operatorname{gr} \mathcal{R}.$ Let $C_X$ (resp. $C_Y$) denote the closed unit ball in $X$ (resp. $Y$) (so $C_X = \{ x \in X : \| x \| \leq 1 \}$). Then the following are equivalent:

1. $y_0$ belongs to the algebraic interior of $\operatorname{Im} \mathcal{R}.$
2. $y_0 \in \operatorname{int} \mathcal{R}\left(x_0 + C_X\right).$
3. There exists $B > 0$ such that for all $0 \leq r \leq 1,$ $y_0 + B r C_Y \subseteq \mathcal{R} \left(x_0 + r C_X\right).$
4. There exist $A > 0$ and $B > 0$ such that for all $x \in x_0 + A C_X$ and all $y \in y_0 + A C_Y,$ $d\left(x, \mathcal{R}^{-1}(y)\right) \leq B \cdot d(y, \mathcal{R}(x)).$
5. There exists $B > 0$ such that for all $x \in X$ and all $y \in y_0 + B C_Y,$ $d \left(x, \mathcal{R}^{-1}(y)\right) \leq \frac{1 + \left\|x - x_0\right\|}{B - \left\|y - y_0\right\|} \cdot d(y, \mathcal{R}(x)).$

== See also ==
- Closed graph theorem – Theorem relating continuity to graphs
- Closed graph theorem (functional analysis) – Theorems connecting continuity to closure of graphs
- Open mapping theorem (functional analysis) – Condition for a linear operator to be open
- Surjection of Fréchet spaces – Characterization of surjectivity
- Uniform boundedness principle – Theorem stating that pointwise boundedness implies uniform boundedness
- Webbed space – Space where open mapping and closed graph theorems hold
