= Algebraic closure (convex analysis) =

Algebraic closure of a subset $A$ of a vector space $X$ is the set of all points that are linearly accessible from $A$. It is denoted by $\operatorname{acl} A$ or $\operatorname{acl}_X A$.

A point $x \in X$ is said to be linearly accessible from a subset $A \subseteq X$ if there exists some $a \in A$ such that the line segment $[a, x) := a + [0, 1) (x-a)$ is contained in $A$.

Necessarily, $A\subseteq \operatorname{acl} A \subseteq \operatorname{acl} \operatorname{acl} A \subseteq \overline{A}$ (the last inclusion holds when X is equipped by any vector topology, Hausdorff or not).

The set A is algebraically closed if $A = \operatorname{acl} A$. The set $\operatorname{acl} A \setminus \operatorname{aint} A$ is the algebraic boundary of A in X.

== Examples ==
The set $\Q$ of rational numbers is algebraically closed but $\Q^c$ is not algebraically open

If $A = \{(x,y) \in \R^2: 0 < y < x^2\} \subseteq \R^2$ then $0 \in (\operatorname{acl} \operatorname{acl} A) \setminus \operatorname{acl} A$. In particular, the algebraic closure need not be algebraically closed. Here, $\overline{A}=\operatorname{acl} \operatorname{acl} A = \{(x,y) \in \R^2: 0 \le y \le x^2\} = (\operatorname{acl} A)\cup\{0\}$.

However, $\operatorname{acl} A =\overline{A}$ for every finite-dimensional convex set A.

Moreover, a convex set is algebraically closed if and only if its complement is algebraically open.

== See also ==
- Algebraic interior

== Bibliography ==
- Narici, Lawrence; Beckenstein, Edward (2011). Topological Vector Spaces. Pure and applied mathematics (Second ed.). Boca Raton, FL: CRC Press. ISBN 978-1584888666. OCLC 144216834.
