= Quasi-relative interior =

Generalization of algebraic interior

In topology, a branch of mathematics, the quasi-relative interior of a subset of a vector space is a refinement of the concept of the interior. Formally, if $X$ is a linear space then the quasi-relative interior of $A \subseteq X$ is
$$\operatorname{qri}(A) := \left\{x \in A : \operatorname{\overline{cone}}(A - x) \text{ is a linear subspace}\right\}$$
where $\operatorname{\overline{cone}}(\cdot)$ denotes the closure of the conic hull.

Let $X$ be a normed vector space. If $C \subseteq X$ is a convex finite-dimensional set then $\operatorname{qri}(C) = \operatorname{ri}(C)$ such that $\operatorname{ri}$ is the relative interior.

== See also ==
- Interior (topology) – Largest open subset of some given set
- Relative interior – Generalization of topological interior
- Algebraic interior – Generalization of topological interior
