= Bounding point =

Mathematical concept related to subsets of vector spaces

In functional analysis, a branch of mathematics, a bounding point of a subset of a vector space is a conceptual extension of the boundary of a set.

== Definition ==
Let $A$ be a subset of a vector space $X$. Then $x \in X$ is a bounding point for $A$ if it is neither an internal point for $A$ nor its complement.
