= Preclosure operator =

Closure operator

In topology, a preclosure operator or Čech closure operator is a map between subsets of a set, similar to a topological closure operator, except that it is not required to be idempotent. That is, a preclosure operator obeys only three of the four Kuratowski closure axioms.

== Definition ==
A preclosure operator on a set $X$ is a map $[\ \ ]_p$

$$[\ \ ]_p:\mathcal{P}(X) \to \mathcal{P}(X)$$

where $\mathcal{P}(X)$ is the power set of $X.$

The preclosure operator has to satisfy the following properties:

1. $[\varnothing]_p = \varnothing \!$ (Preservation of nullary unions);
2. $A \subseteq [A]_p$ (Extensivity);
3. $[A \cup B]_p = [A]_p \cup [B]_p$ (Preservation of binary unions).

The last axiom implies the following:

4. $A \subseteq B$ implies $[A]_p \subseteq [B]_p$.

== Topology ==
A set $A$ is closed (with respect to the preclosure) if $[A]_p=A$. A set $U \subset X$ is open (with respect to the preclosure) if its complement $A = X \setminus U$ is closed. The collection of all open sets generated by the preclosure operator is a topology; however, the above topology does not capture the notion of convergence associated to the operator, one should consider a pretopology, instead.

== Examples ==
=== Premetrics ===
Given $d$ a premetric on $X$, then

$$[A]_p = \{x \in X : d(x,A)=0\}$$

is a preclosure on $X.$

=== Sequential spaces ===
The sequential closure operator $[\ \ ]_\text{seq}$ is a preclosure operator. Given a topology $\mathcal{T}$ with respect to which the sequential closure operator is defined, the topological space $(X,\mathcal{T})$ is a sequential space if and only if the topology $\mathcal{T}_\text{seq}$ generated by $[\ \ ]_\text{seq}$ is equal to $\mathcal{T},$ that is, if $\mathcal{T}_\text{seq} = \mathcal{T}.$

== See also ==
- Eduard Čech
