= Relative interior =

Generalization of topological interior

In mathematics, the relative interior of a set is a refinement of the concept of the interior, which is often more useful when dealing with low-dimensional sets placed in higher-dimensional spaces.

Formally, the relative interior of a set $S$ (denoted $\operatorname{relint}(S)$) is defined as its interior within the affine hull of $S.$ In other words,
$$\operatorname{relint}(S) := \{ x \in S : \text{ there exists } \epsilon > 0 \text{ such that } B_\epsilon(x) \cap \operatorname{aff}(S) \subseteq S \},$$
where $\operatorname{aff}(S)$ is the affine hull of $S,$ and $B_\epsilon(x)$ is a ball of radius $\epsilon$ centered at $x$. Any metric can be used for the construction of the ball; all metrics define the same set as the relative interior.

A set is relatively open iff it is equal to its relative interior. Note that when $\operatorname{aff}(S)$ is a closed subspace of the full vector space (always the case when the full vector space is finite dimensional) then being relatively closed is equivalent to being closed.

For any convex set $C \subseteq \mathbb{R}^n$ the relative interior is equivalently defined as
$$\begin{align}\operatorname{relint}(C) &:= \{x \in C : \text{ for all } y \in C, \text{ there exists some } \lambda > 1 \text{ such that } \lambda x + (1 - \lambda) y \in C\}\\
&= \{x \in C : \text{ for all } y\neq x \in C, \text{ there exists some } z \in C \text{ such that } x\in (y,z)\}.
\end{align}$$
where $x\in (y,z)$ means that there exists some $0< \lambda < 1$ such that $x=\lambda z + (1 - \lambda) y$.

== Comparison to interior ==
- The interior of a point in an at least one-dimensional ambient space is empty, but its relative interior is the point itself.
- The interior of a line segment in an at least two-dimensional ambient space is empty, but its relative interior is the line segment without its endpoints.
- The interior of a disc in an at least three-dimensional ambient space is empty, but its relative interior is the same disc without its circular edge.

== Properties ==
Theorem—If $A\subset \R^n$ is nonempty and convex, then its relative interior $\mathrm{relint}(A)$ is the union of a nested sequence of nonempty compact convex subsets $K_1\subset K_2\subset K_3\subset\cdots \subset \mathrm{relint}(A)$.

Proof

Since we can always go down to the affine span of $A$, WLOG, the relative interior has dimension $n$. Now let $K_j \equiv [-j,j]^n \cap \left\{ x \in \text{int}(K) : \mathrm{dist}(x, (\text{int}(K))^c) \ge \frac{1}{j} \right\}$.

Theorem—Here "+" denotes Minkowski sum.

- $\mathrm{relint}(S_1) + \mathrm{relint}(S_2) \subset \mathrm{relint}(S_1 + S_2)$ for general sets. They are equal if both $S_1, S_2$ are also convex.
- If $S_1, S_2$ are convex and relatively open sets, then $S_1 + S_2$ is convex and relatively open.

Theorem—Here $\mathrm{Cone}$ denotes positive cone. That is, $\mathrm{Cone}(S) = \{rx: x\in S, r > 0\}$.

- $\mathrm{Cone}(\mathrm{relint}(S)) \subset \mathrm{relint}(\mathrm{Cone}(S))$. They are equal if $S$ is convex.

== See also ==
- Interior (topology) – Largest open subset of some given set
- Algebraic interior – Generalization of topological interior
- Quasi-relative interior – Generalization of algebraic interior
