= Kuratowski closure axioms =

Axioms for defining a topology

In topology and related branches of mathematics, the Kuratowski closure axioms are a set of axioms that can be used to define a topological structure on a set. They are equivalent to the more commonly used open set definition. They were first formalized by Kazimierz Kuratowski, and the idea was further studied by mathematicians such as Wacław Sierpiński and António Monteiro, among others.

A similar set of axioms can be used to define a topological structure using only the dual notion of an interior operator.

== Definition ==
A Kuratowski closure operator, also called a topological closure, is a special case of the general concept of an abstract closure operator in mathematics. There are other special cases that are closely related to the Kuratowski closure.

=== Kuratowski closure operators and weakenings ===
Let $X$ be an arbitrary set and $\mathcal{P}(X)$ its power set. A Kuratowski closure operator is a unary operation $\mathbf{c}:\mathcal{P}(X) \to \mathcal{P}(X)$ with the following properties:

[K1] It preserves the empty set: $\mathbf{c}(\varnothing) = \varnothing$;

[K2] It is extensive: for all $A \subseteq X$, $A \subseteq \mathbf{c}(A)$;

[K3] It is idempotent: for all $A \subseteq X$, $\mathbf{c}(A) = \mathbf{c}(\mathbf{c}(A))$;

[K4] It preserves/distributes over binary unions: for all $A,B \subseteq X$, $\mathbf{c}(A \cup B) = \mathbf{c}(A) \cup \mathbf{c}(B)$.

A consequence of $\mathbf{c}$ preserving binary unions is the following condition:

[K4'] It is monotone: $A \subseteq B \Rightarrow \mathbf{c}(A) \subseteq \mathbf{c}(B)$.

In fact if we rewrite the equality in [K4] as an inclusion, giving the weaker axiom [K4''] (subadditivity):

[K4''] It is subadditive: for all $A,B \subseteq X$, $\mathbf{c}(A \cup B) \subseteq \mathbf{c}(A) \cup \mathbf{c}(B)$,

then it is easy to see that axioms [K4'] and [K4''] together are equivalent to [K4] (see the next-to-last paragraph of Proof 2 below).

Kuratowski (1966) includes a fifth (optional) axiom requiring that singleton sets should be stable under closure: for all $x \in X$, $\mathbf{c}(\{x\}) = \{x\}$. He refers to topological spaces which satisfy all five axioms as T_{1}-spaces in contrast to the more general spaces which only satisfy the four listed axioms. Indeed, these spaces correspond exactly to the topological T_{1}-spaces via the usual correspondence (see below).

If requirement [K3] is omitted, then the axioms define a Čech closure operator. If [K1] is omitted instead, then an operator satisfying [K2], [K3] and [K4'] is said to be a Moore closure operator. A pair $(X, \mathbf{c})$ is called Kuratowski, Čech or Moore closure space depending on the axioms satisfied by $\mathbf{c}$.

=== Alternative axiomatizations ===
The four Kuratowski closure axioms can be replaced by a single condition, given by Pervin:

[P] For all $A,B \subseteq X$, $A \cup \mathbf{c}(A) \cup \mathbf{c}(\mathbf{c}(B)) = \mathbf{c}(A \cup B) \setminus \mathbf{c}(\varnothing)$.

Axioms [K1]–[K4] can be derived as a consequence of this requirement:

1. Choose $A = B = \varnothing$. Then $\varnothing \cup \mathbf{c}(\varnothing) \cup \mathbf{c}(\mathbf{c}(\varnothing)) = \mathbf{c}(\varnothing) \setminus \mathbf{c}(\varnothing) = \varnothing$, or $\mathbf{c}(\varnothing) \cup \mathbf{c}(\mathbf{c}(\varnothing)) = \varnothing$. This immediately implies [K1].
2. Choose an arbitrary $A \subseteq X$ and $B = \varnothing$. Then, applying axiom [K1], $A \cup \mathbf{c}(A) = \mathbf{c}(A)$, implying [K2].
3. Choose $A = \varnothing$ and an arbitrary $B \subseteq X$. Then, applying axiom [K1], $\mathbf{c}(\mathbf{c}(B)) = \mathbf{c}(B)$, which is [K3].
4. Choose arbitrary $A,B \subseteq X$. Applying axioms [K1]–[K3], one derives [K4].

Alternatively, Monteiro (1945) had proposed a weaker axiom that only entails [K2]–[K4]:

[M] For all $A,B \subseteq X$, $A \cup \mathbf{c}(A)\cup \mathbf{c}(\mathbf{c}(B)) \subseteq \mathbf{c}(A \cup B)$.

Requirement [K1] is independent of [M] : indeed, if $X \neq \varnothing$, the operator $\mathbf{c}^\star : \mathcal{P}(X) \to \mathcal{P}(X)$ defined by the constant assignment $A \mapsto \mathbf{c}^\star(A) := X$ satisfies [M] but does not preserve the empty set, since $\mathbf{c}^\star(\varnothing) = X$. Notice that, by definition, any operator satisfying [M] is a Moore closure operator.

A more symmetric alternative to [M] was also proven by M. O. Botelho and M. H. Teixeira to imply axioms [K2]–[K4]:

[BT] For all $A,B \subseteq X$, $A \cup B \cup \mathbf{c}(\mathbf{c}(A)) \cup \mathbf{c}(\mathbf{c}(B)) = \mathbf{c}(A \cup B)$.

== Analogous structures ==
=== Interior, exterior and boundary operators ===
A dual notion to Kuratowski closure operators is that of Kuratowski interior operator, which is a map $\mathbf{i} : \mathcal{P}(X) \to \mathcal{P}(X)$ satisfying the following similar requirements:

[I1] It preserves the total space: $\mathbf{i}(X) = X$;

[I2] It is intensive: for all $A \subseteq X$, $\mathbf{i}(A) \subseteq A$;

[I3] It is idempotent: for all $A \subseteq X$, $\mathbf{i}(\mathbf{i}(A)) = \mathbf{i}(A)$;

[I4] It preserves binary intersections: for all $A,B \subseteq X$, $\mathbf{i}(A \cap B) = \mathbf{i}(A) \cap \mathbf{i}(B)$.

For these operators, one can reach conclusions that are completely analogous to what was inferred for Kuratowski closures. For example, all Kuratowski interior operators are isotonic, i.e. they satisfy [K4'], and because of intensivity [I2], it is possible to weaken the equality in [I3] to a simple inclusion.

The duality between Kuratowski closures and interiors is provided by the natural complement operator on $\mathcal{P}(X)$, the map $\mathbf{n} : \mathcal{P}(X) \to \mathcal{P}(X)$ sending $A \mapsto \mathbf{n}(A):= X \setminus A$. This map is an orthocomplementation on the power set lattice, meaning it satisfies De Morgan's laws: if $\mathcal{I}$ is an arbitrary set of indices and $\{A_i\}_{i\in\mathcal I} \subseteq \mathcal{P}(X)$,
$$\mathbf{n}\left(\bigcup_{i \in \mathcal I} A_i\right) = \bigcap_{i\in \mathcal I} \mathbf{n}(A_i), \qquad
\mathbf{n}\left(\bigcap_{i \in \mathcal I} A_i\right) = \bigcup_{i\in \mathcal I} \mathbf{n}(A_i).$$

By employing these laws, together with the defining properties of $\mathbf{n}$, one can show that any Kuratowski interior induces a Kuratowski closure (and vice versa), via the defining relation $\mathbf {c} := \mathbf{nin}$ (and $\mathbf {i} := \mathbf{ncn}$). Every result obtained concerning $\mathbf{c}$ may be converted into a result concerning $\mathbf{i}$ by employing these relations in conjunction with the properties of the orthocomplementation $\mathbf{n}$.

Pervin (1964) further provides analogous axioms for Kuratowski exterior operators and Kuratowski boundary operators, which also induce Kuratowski closures via the relations $\mathbf{c} := \mathbf{ne}$ and $\mathbf{c}(A):= A \cup \mathbf{b}(A)$.

=== Abstract operators ===
Notice that axioms [K1]–[K4] may be adapted to define an abstract unary operation $\mathbf c : L \to L$ on a general bounded lattice $(L,\land,\lor,\mathbf 0, \mathbf 1)$, by formally substituting set-theoretic inclusion with the partial order associated to the lattice, set-theoretic union with the join operation, and set-theoretic intersections with the meet operation; similarly for axioms [I1]–[I4]. If the lattice is orthocomplemented, these two abstract operations induce one another in the usual way. Abstract closure or interior operators can be used to define a generalized topology on the lattice.

Since neither unions nor the empty set appear in the requirement for a Moore closure operator, the definition may be adapted to define an abstract unary operator $\mathbf{c} : S \to S$ on an arbitrary poset $S$.

== Connection to other axiomatizations of topology ==
=== Induction of topology from closure ===
A closure operator naturally induces a topology as follows. Let $X$ be an arbitrary set. We shall say that a subset $C\subseteq X$ is closed with respect to a Kuratowski closure operator $\mathbf{c} : \mathcal{P}(X) \to \mathcal{P}(X)$ if and only if it is a fixed point of said operator, or in other words it is stable under $\mathbf{c}$, i.e. $\mathbf{c}(C) = C$. The claim is that the family of all subsets of the total space that are complements of closed sets satisfies the three usual requirements for a topology, or equivalently, the family $\mathfrak{S}[\mathbf{c}]$ of all closed sets satisfies the following:

[T1] It is a bounded sublattice of $\mathcal{P}(X)$, i.e. $X,\varnothing \in\mathfrak{S}[\mathbf{c}]$;

[T2] It is complete under arbitrary intersections, i.e. if $\mathcal{I}$ is an arbitrary set of indices and $\{C_i\}_{i\in\mathcal I} \subseteq \mathfrak{S}[\mathbf{c}]$, then $\bigcap_{i\in\mathcal I} C_i \in \mathfrak{S}[\mathbf{c}]$;

[T3] It is complete under finite unions, i.e. if $\mathcal{I}$ is a finite set of indices and $\{C_i\}_{i\in\mathcal I} \subseteq \mathfrak{S}[\mathbf{c}]$, then $\bigcup_{i\in\mathcal I} C_i \in \mathfrak{S}[\mathbf{c}]$.

Notice that, by idempotency [K3], one may succinctly write $\mathfrak{S}[\mathbf{c}] = \operatorname{im}(\mathbf{c})$.

Proof 1.

[T1] By extensivity [K2], $X\subseteq\mathbf{c}(X)$ and since closure maps the power set of $X$ into itself (that is, the image of any subset is a subset of $X$), $\mathbf{c}(X)\subseteq X$ we have $X = \mathbf{c}(X)$. Thus $X \in \mathfrak{S}[\mathbf{c}]$. The preservation of the empty set [K1] readily implies $\varnothing \in\mathfrak{S}[\mathbf{c}]$.

[T2] Next, let $\mathcal{I}$ be an arbitrary set of indices and let $C_i$ be closed for every $i\in\mathcal{I}$. By extensivity [K2], $\bigcap_{i\in\mathcal{I}}C_i \subseteq \mathbf{c}\left(\bigcap_{i\in\mathcal{I}}C_i\right)$. Also, by isotonicity [K4'], if $\bigcap_{i\in\mathcal I} C_i \subseteq C_i$for all indices $i \in \mathcal I$, then $\mathbf{c}\left(\bigcap_{i\in\mathcal{I}}C_i \right) \subseteq \mathbf{c}(C_i) = C_i$ for all $i \in \mathcal I$, which implies $\mathbf{c}\left(\bigcap_{i\in\mathcal{I}}C_i \right) \subseteq \bigcap_{i\in\mathcal{I}}C_i$. Therefore, $\bigcap_{i\in\mathcal{I}}C_i = \mathbf{c}\left(\bigcap_{i\in\mathcal{I}}C_i\right)$, meaning $\bigcap_{i\in\mathcal{I}}C_i \in \mathfrak{S}[\mathbf{c}]$.

[T3] Finally, let $\mathcal{I}$ be a finite set of indices and let $C_i$ be closed for every $i\in\mathcal{I}$. From the preservation of binary unions [K4], and using induction on the number of subsets of which we take the union, we have $\bigcup_{i\in\mathcal{I}}C_i = \mathbf{c}\left(\bigcup_{i\in\mathcal{I}}C_i \right)$. Thus, $\bigcup_{i\in\mathcal{I}}C_i \in \mathfrak{S}[\mathbf{c}]$.

=== Induction of closure from topology ===
Conversely, given a family $\kappa$ satisfying axioms [T1]–[T3], it is possible to construct a Kuratowski closure operator in the following way: if $A \in \mathcal{P}(X)$ and $A^\uparrow = \{B \in \mathcal{P}(X)\ |\ A \subseteq B \}$ is the inclusion upset of $A$, then
$$\mathbf{c}_\kappa(A) := \bigcap_{B \in (\kappa \cap A^\uparrow)} B$$

defines a Kuratowski closure operator $\mathbf{c}_\kappa$ on $\mathcal{P}(X)$.

Proof 2.

[K1] Since $\varnothing^\uparrow = \mathcal{P}(X)$, $\mathbf{c}_\kappa(\varnothing)$ reduces to the intersection of all sets in the family $\kappa$; but $\varnothing \in \kappa$ by axiom [T1], so the intersection collapses to the null set and [K1] follows.

[K2] By definition of $A^\uparrow$, we have that $A \subseteq B$ for all $B \in \left(\kappa \cap A^\uparrow\right)$, and thus $A$ must be contained in the intersection of all such sets. Hence follows extensivity [K2].

[K3] Notice that, for all $A \in \mathcal{P}(X)$, the family $\mathbf{c}_\kappa(A)^\uparrow \cap \kappa$ contains $\mathbf{c}_\kappa(A)$ itself as a minimal element w.r.t. inclusion. Hence $\mathbf{c}_\kappa^2(A) = \bigcap_{B \in \mathbf{c}_\kappa(A)^\uparrow \cap \kappa}B = \mathbf{c}_\kappa(A)$, which is idempotence [K3].

[K4'] Let $A \subseteq B \subseteq X$: then $B^\uparrow \subseteq A^\uparrow$, and thus $\kappa \cap B^\uparrow \subseteq \kappa \cap A^\uparrow$. Since the latter family may contain more elements than the former, we find $\mathbf{c}_\kappa(A) \subseteq \mathbf{c}_\kappa(B)$, which is isotonicity [K4']. Notice that isotonicity implies $\mathbf{c}_\kappa(A) \subseteq \mathbf{c}_\kappa(A\cup B)$ and $\mathbf{c}_\kappa(B) \subseteq \mathbf{c}_\kappa(A\cup B)$, which together imply $\mathbf{c}_\kappa(A) \cup \mathbf{c}_\kappa(B) \subseteq \mathbf{c}_\kappa(A\cup B)$.

[K4] Finally, fix $A,B \in \mathcal{P}(X)$. Axiom [T2] implies $\mathbf{c}_\kappa(A), \mathbf{c}_\kappa(B) \in \kappa$; furthermore, axiom [T2] implies that $\mathbf{c}_\kappa(A) \cup \mathbf{c}_\kappa(B) \in \kappa$. By extensivity [K2] one has $\mathbf{c}_\kappa(A) \in A^\uparrow$ and $\mathbf{c}_\kappa(B) \in B^\uparrow$, so that $\mathbf{c}_\kappa(A) \cup \mathbf{c}_\kappa(B) \in \left(A^\uparrow\right) \cap \left(B^\uparrow\right)$. But $\left(A^\uparrow\right) \cap \left(B^\uparrow\right) = (A \cup B)^\uparrow$, so that all in all $\mathbf{c}_\kappa(A) \cup \mathbf{c}_\kappa(B) \in \kappa\cap (A \cup B)^\uparrow$. Since then $\mathbf{c}_\kappa(A \cup B)$ is a minimal element of $\kappa \cap (A \cup B)^\uparrow$ w.r.t. inclusion, we find $\mathbf{c}_\kappa(A \cup B) \subseteq \mathbf{c}_\kappa(A) \cup \mathbf{c}_\kappa(B)$. Point 4. ensures additivity [K4].

=== Exact correspondence between the two structures ===
In fact, these two complementary constructions are inverse to one another: if $\mathrm{Cls}_\text{K}(X)$ is the collection of all Kuratowski closure operators on $X$, and $\mathrm{Atp}(X)$ is the collection of all families consisting of complements of all sets in a topology, i.e. the collection of all families satisfying [T1]–[T3], then $\mathfrak{S} : \mathrm{Cls}_\text{K}(X) \to \mathrm{Atp}(X)$ such that $\mathbf{c} \mapsto \mathfrak{S}[\mathbf{c}]$ is a bijection, whose inverse is given by the assignment $\mathfrak{C}: \kappa \mapsto \mathbf{c}_\kappa$.

Proof 3.

First we prove that $\mathfrak{C} \circ \mathfrak{S} = \mathfrak{1}_{\mathrm{Cls}_\text{K}(X)}$, the identity operator on $\mathrm{Cls}_\text{K}(X)$. For a given Kuratowski closure $\mathbf{c} \in \mathrm{Cls}_\text{K}(X)$, define $\mathbf{c}' := \mathfrak{C}[\mathfrak{S}[\mathbf{c}]]$; then if $A \in \mathcal{P}(X)$ its primed closure $\mathbf{c}'(A)$ is the intersection of all $\mathbf{c}$-stable sets that contain $A$. Its non-primed closure $\mathbf{c}(A)$ satisfies this description: by extensivity [K2] we have $A \subseteq \mathbf{c}(A)$, and by idempotence [K3] we have $\mathbf{c}(\mathbf{c}(A)) = \mathbf{c}(A)$, and thus $\mathbf{c}(A) \in \left(A^\uparrow \cap \mathfrak{S}[\mathbf{c}]\right)$. Now, let $C \in \left(A^\uparrow \cap \mathfrak{S}[\mathbf{c}]\right)$ such that $A \subseteq C \subseteq \mathbf{c}(A)$: by isotonicity [K4'] we have $\mathbf{c}(A) \subseteq \mathbf{c}(C)$, and since $\mathbf{c}(C) = C$ we conclude that $C = \mathbf{c}(A)$. Hence $\mathbf{c}(A)$ is the minimal element of $A^\uparrow \cap \mathfrak{S}[\mathbf{c}]$ w.r.t. inclusion, implying $\mathbf{c}'(A) = \mathbf{c}(A)$.

Now we prove that $\mathfrak{S} \circ \mathfrak{C} = \mathfrak{1}_{\mathrm{Atp}(X)}$. If $\kappa \in \mathrm{Atp}(X)$ and $\kappa':= \mathfrak{S}[\mathfrak{C}[\kappa]]$ is the family of all sets that are stable under $\mathbf{c}_\kappa$, the result follows if both $\kappa' \subseteq \kappa$ and $\kappa \subseteq \kappa'$. Let $A \in \kappa'$: hence $\mathbf{c}_\kappa(A) = A$. Since $\mathbf{c}_\kappa(A)$ is the intersection of an arbitrary subfamily of $\kappa$, and the latter is complete under arbitrary intersections by [T2], then $A = \mathbf{c}_\kappa(A) \in \kappa$. Conversely, if $A \in \kappa$, then $\mathbf{c}_\kappa(A)$ is the minimal superset of $A$ that is contained in $\kappa$. But that is trivially $A$ itself, implying $A \in \kappa'$.

We observe that one may also extend the bijection $\mathfrak{S}$ to the collection $\mathrm{Cls}_{\check C}(X)$ of all Čech closure operators, which strictly contains $\mathrm{Cls}_\text{K}(X)$; this extension $\overline{\mathfrak{S}}$ is also surjective, which signifies that all Čech closure operators on $X$ also induce a topology on $X$. However, this means that $\overline{\mathfrak{S}}$ is no longer a bijection.

== Examples ==
- As discussed above, given a topological space $X$ we may define the closure of any subset $A \subseteq X$ to be the set $\mathbf{c}(A)=\bigcap\{C\text{ a closed subset of }X| A\subseteq C\}$, i.e. the intersection of all closed sets of $X$ which contain $A$. The set $\mathbf{c}(A)$ is the smallest closed set of $X$ containing $A$, and the operator $\mathbf{c}:\mathcal{P}(X) \to \mathcal{P}(X)$ is a Kuratowski closure operator.
- If $X$ is any set, the operators $\mathbf{c}_\top, \mathbf{c}_\bot : \mathcal{P}(X) \to \mathcal{P}(X)$ such that
  $$\mathbf{c}_\top(A) = \begin{cases}
\varnothing & A = \varnothing, \\
X & A \neq \varnothing,
\end{cases} \qquad \mathbf{c}_\bot(A) = A\quad \forall A \in \mathcal{P}(X),$$
  are Kuratowski closures. The first induces the indiscrete topology $\{\varnothing,X\}$, while the second induces the discrete topology $\mathcal{P}(X)$.
- Fix an arbitrary $S \subsetneq X$, and let $\mathbf{c}_S: \mathcal{P}(X) \to \mathcal{P}(X)$ be such that $\mathbf{c}_S(A) := A \cup S$ for all $A \in \mathcal{P}(X)$. Then $\mathbf{c}_S$ defines a Kuratowski closure; the corresponding family of closed sets $\mathfrak{S}[\mathbf{c}_S]$ coincides with $S^\uparrow$, the family of all subsets that contain $S$. When $S = \varnothing$, we once again retrieve the discrete topology $\mathcal{P}(X)$ (i.e. $\mathbf{c}_{\varnothing}=\mathbf{c}_\bot$, as can be seen from the definitions).
- If $\lambda$ is an infinite cardinal number such that $\lambda \leq \operatorname{crd}(X)$, then the operator $\mathbf{c}_\lambda : \mathcal{P}(X) \to \mathcal{P}(X)$ such that
  $$\mathbf{c}_\lambda(A) = \begin{cases}
A & \operatorname{crd}(A) < \lambda, \\
X & \operatorname{crd}(A) \geq \lambda
\end{cases}$$
  satisfies all four Kuratowski axioms. If $\lambda = \aleph_0$, this operator induces the cofinite topology on $X$; if $\lambda = \aleph_1$, it induces the cocountable topology.

== Properties ==
- Since any Kuratowski closure is isotonic, and so is obviously any inclusion mapping, one has the (isotonic) Galois connection $\langle \mathbf{c}: \mathcal{P}(X) \to \mathrm{im}(\mathbf{c});\iota : \mathrm{im}(\mathbf{c}) \hookrightarrow \mathcal{P}(X) \rangle$, provided one views $\mathcal{P}(X)$as a poset with respect to inclusion, and $\mathrm{im}(\mathbf{c})$ as a subposet of $\mathcal{P}(X)$. Indeed, it can be easily verified that, for all $A \in \mathcal{P}(X)$ and $C \in \mathrm{im}(\mathbf{c})$, $\mathbf{c}(A) \subseteq C$ if and only if $A \subseteq \iota(C)$.
- If $\{A_i\}_{i\in\mathcal I}$ is a subfamily of $\mathcal{P}(X)$, then
  $$\bigcup_{i\in\mathcal I} \mathbf{c}(A_i) \subseteq \mathbf{c}\left(\bigcup_{i\in\mathcal I} A_i\right), \qquad \mathbf{c}\left(\bigcap_{i\in\mathcal I} A_i\right) \subseteq \bigcap_{i\in\mathcal I} \mathbf{c}(A_i).$$
- If $A,B \in \mathcal{P}(X)$, then $\mathbf{c}(A) \setminus \mathbf{c}(B) \subseteq \mathbf{c}(A\setminus B)$.

== Topological concepts in terms of closure ==
=== Refinements and subspaces ===
A pair of Kuratowski closures $\mathbf{c}_1, \mathbf{c}_2 : \mathcal{P}(X) \to \mathcal{P}(X)$ such that $\mathbf{c}_2(A) \subseteq \mathbf{c}_1(A)$ for all $A \in \mathcal{P}(X)$ induce topologies $\tau_1,\tau_2$ such that $\tau_1 \subseteq \tau_2$, and vice versa. In other words, $\mathbf{c}_1$ dominates $\mathbf{c}_2$ if and only if the topology induced by the latter is a refinement of the topology induced by the former, or equivalently $\mathfrak{S}[\mathbf{c}_1] \subseteq \mathfrak{S}[\mathbf{c}_2]$. For example, $\mathbf{c}_\top$ clearly dominates $\mathbf{c}_\bot$(the latter just being the identity on $\mathcal{P}(X)$). Since the same conclusion can be reached substituting $\tau_i$ with the family $\kappa_i$ containing the complements of all its members, if $\mathrm{Cls}_\text{K}(X)$ is endowed with the partial order $\mathbf{c} \leq \mathbf{c}' \iff \mathbf{c}(A) \subseteq \mathbf{c}'(A)$ for all $A \in \mathcal{P}(X)$ and $\mathrm{Atp}(X)$ is endowed with the refinement order, then we may conclude that $\mathfrak{S}$ is an antitonic mapping between posets.

In any induced topology (relative to the subset A) the closed sets induce a new closure operator that is just the original closure operator restricted to A: $\mathbf{c}_A(B) = A \cap \mathbf{c}_X(B)$, for all $B \subseteq A$.

=== Continuous maps, closed maps and homeomorphisms ===
A function $f:(X,\mathbf{c})\to (Y,\mathbf{c}')$ is continuous at a point $p$ iff $p\in\mathbf{c}(A) \Rightarrow f(p)\in\mathbf{c}'(f(A))$, and it is continuous everywhere iff
$$f(\mathbf{c}(A)) \subseteq \mathbf{c}'(f(A))$$
for all subsets $A \in \mathcal{P}(X)$. The mapping $f$ is a closed map iff the reverse inclusion holds, and it is a homeomorphism iff it is both continuous and closed, i.e. iff equality holds.

=== Separation axioms ===
Let $(X, \mathbf{c})$ be a Kuratowski closure space. Then

- $X$ is a T_{0}-space iff $x \neq y$ implies $\mathbf{c}(\{x\}) \neq \mathbf{c}(\{y\})$;
- $X$ is a T_{1}-space iff $\mathbf{c}(\{x\})=\{x\}$ for all $x \in X$;
- $X$ is a T_{2}-space iff $x \neq y$ implies that there exists a set $A \in \mathcal{P}(X)$ such that both $x \notin \mathbf{c}(A)$ and $y \notin \mathbf{c}(\mathbf{n}(A))$, where $\mathbf{n}$ is the set complement operator.

=== Closeness and separation ===
A point $p$ is close to a subset $A$ if $p\in\mathbf{c}(A).$This can be used to define a proximity relation on the points and subsets of a set.

Two sets $A,B \in \mathcal{P}(X)$ are separated iff $(A \cap \mathbf{c}(B)) \cup (B \cap \mathbf{c}(A)) = \varnothing$. The space $X$ is connected iff it cannot be written as the union of two separated subsets.

== See also ==
- Characterizations of the category of topological spaces – Multiple equivalent ways to define a topological space
- Čech closure operator – Closure operator
- Closure operator – Mathematical operator
- Closure algebra – Algebraic structure
- Kuratowski's closure-complement problem – Problem in topology
- Preclosure operator – Closure operator
- Pretopological space – Generalized topological space
- Topological space – Mathematical space with a notion of closeness
