= Vadim Yefremovich =

Soviet mathematician

Vadim Arsenyevich Yefremovich (or Efremovich) (Russian: Вади́м Арсе́ньевич Ефре́мович; 16 October 1903 – 1 May 1989) was a Soviet mathematician.

Yefremovich was a member of the Moscow Topological School and specialized in the geometric aspects of general topology. He introduced the notion of proximity spaces at the First International Topological Conference in Moscow in 1935. He was imprisoned from 1937 to 1944, and did not publish on proximity spaces until 1951, at which point the theory was developed rapidly by Efremovič and associates.

Yefremovich also introduced the notion of "volume invariants" for "equimorphisms" (that is, uniformly bicontinuous) on metric spaces. These have proven to be very important in the study of manifolds and hyperbolic geometry.

== Bibliography ==
- Vadim Arsenyevich Yefremovich (obituary), in Russian Mathematical Surveys 45:6 (1990), pp 137–138.
