= Algebraic interior =

Generalization of topological interior

In functional analysis, a branch of mathematics, the algebraic interior or radial kernel of a subset of a vector space is a refinement of the concept of the interior.

== Definition ==
Assume that $A$ is a subset of a vector space $X.$ The algebraic interior (or radial kernel) of $A$ with respect to $X$ is the set of all points at which $A$ is a radial set. A point $a_0 \in A$ is called an internal point of $A$ and $A$ is said to be radial at $a_0$ if for every $x \in X$ there exists a real number $t_x > 0$ such that for every $t \in [0, t_x],$ $a_0 + t x \in A.$ This last condition can also be written as $a_0 + [0, t_x] x \subseteq A$ where the set $a_0 + [0, t_x] x ~:=~ \left\{a_0 + t x : t \in [0, t_x]\right\}$ is the line segment (or closed interval) starting at $a_0$ and ending at $a_0 + t_x x;$ this line segment is a subset of $a_0 + [0, \infty) x,$ which is the ray emanating from $a_0$ in the direction of $x$ (that is, parallel to/a translation of $[0, \infty) x$). Thus geometrically, an interior point of a subset $A$ is a point $a_0 \in A$ with the property that in every possible direction (vector) $x \neq 0,$ $A$ contains some (non-degenerate) line segment starting at $a_0$ and heading in that direction (i.e. a subset of the ray $a_0 + [0, \infty) x$). The algebraic interior of $A$ (with respect to $X$) is the set of all such points. That is to say, it is the subset of points contained in a given set with respect to which it is radial points of the set.

If $M$ is a linear subspace of $X$ and $A \subseteq X$ then this definition can be generalized to the algebraic interior of $A$ with respect to $M$ is: $\operatorname{aint}_M A := \left\{ a \in X : \text{ for all } m \in M, \text{ there exists some } t_m > 0 \text{ such that } a + \left[0, t_m\right] \cdot m \subseteq A \right\}.$ where $\operatorname{aint}_M A \subseteq A$ always holds and if $\operatorname{aint}_M A \neq \varnothing$ then $M \subseteq \operatorname{aff} (A - A),$ where $\operatorname{aff} (A - A)$ is the affine hull of $A - A$ (which is equal to $\operatorname{span}(A - A)$).

Algebraic closure

A point $x \in X$ is said to be linearly accessible from a subset $A \subseteq X$ if there exists some $a \in A$ such that the line segment $[a, x) := a + [0, 1) (x-a)$ is contained in $A.$ The algebraic closure of $A$ with respect to $X$, denoted by $\operatorname{acl}_X A,$ consists of ($A$ and) all points in $X$ that are linearly accessible from $A.$

== Algebraic Interior (Core) ==
In the special case where $M := X,$ the set $\operatorname{aint}_X A$ is called the algebraic interior or core of $A$ and it is denoted by $A^i$ or $\operatorname{core} A.$ Formally, if $X$ is a vector space then the algebraic interior of $A \subseteq X$ is $\operatorname{aint}_X A := \operatorname{core}(A) := \left\{ a \in A : \text{ for all } x \in X, \text{ there exists some } t_x > 0, \text{ such that for all } t \in \left[0, t_x\right], a + tx \in A \right\}.$

We call A algebraically open in X if $A = \operatorname{aint}_X A$

If $A$ is non-empty, then these additional subsets are also useful for the statements of many theorems in convex functional analysis (such as the Ursescu theorem):

$${}^{ic} A :=
\begin{cases}
{}^i A & \text{ if } \operatorname{aff} A \text{ is a closed set,} \\
\varnothing & \text{ otherwise}
\end{cases}$$

$${}^{ib} A :=
\begin{cases}
{}^i A & \text{ if } \operatorname{span} (A - a) \text{ is a barrelled linear subspace of } X \text{ for any/all } a \in A \text{,} \\
\varnothing & \text{ otherwise}
\end{cases}$$

If $X$ is a Fréchet space, $A$ is convex, and $\operatorname{aff} A$ is closed in $X$ then ${}^{ic} A = {}^{ib} A$ but in general it is possible to have ${}^{ic} A = \varnothing$ while ${}^{ib} A$ is not empty.

=== Examples ===
If $A = \{x \in \R^2: x_2 \geq x_1^2 \text{ or } x_2 \leq 0\} \subseteq \R^2$ then $0 \in \operatorname{core}(A),$ but $0 \not\in \operatorname{int}(A)$ and $0 \not\in \operatorname{core}(\operatorname{core}(A)).$

=== Properties of core ===
Suppose $A, B \subseteq X.$

- In general, $\operatorname{core} A \neq \operatorname{core}(\operatorname{core} A).$ But if $A$ is a convex set then:
  - $\operatorname{core} A = \operatorname{core}(\operatorname{core} A),$ and
  - for all $x_0 \in \operatorname{core} A, y \in A, 0 < \lambda \leq 1$ then $\lambda x_0 + (1 - \lambda)y \in \operatorname{core} A.$
- $A$ is an absorbing subset of a real vector space if and only if $0 \in \operatorname{core}(A).$
- $A + \operatorname{core} B \subseteq \operatorname{core}(A + B)$
- $A + \operatorname{core} B = \operatorname{core}(A + B)$ if $B = \operatorname{core}B.$

Both the core and the algebraic closure of a convex set are again convex. If $C$ is convex, $c \in \operatorname{core} C,$ and $b \in \operatorname{acl}_X C$ then the line segment $[c, b) := c + [0, 1) b$ is contained in $\operatorname{core} C.$

=== Relation to topological interior ===
Let $X$ be a topological vector space, $\operatorname{int}$ denote the interior operator, and $A \subseteq X$ then:

- $\operatorname{int}A \subseteq \operatorname{core}A$
- If $A$ is nonempty convex and $X$ is finite-dimensional, then $\operatorname{int} A = \operatorname{core} A.$
- If $A$ is convex with non-empty interior, then $\operatorname{int}A = \operatorname{core} A.$
- If $A$ is a closed convex set and $X$ is a complete metric space, then $\operatorname{int} A = \operatorname{core} A.$

== Relative algebraic interior ==
If $M = \operatorname{aff} (A - A)$ then the set $\operatorname{aint}_M A$ is denoted by ${}^iA := \operatorname{aint}_{\operatorname{aff} (A - A)} A$ and it is called the relative algebraic interior of $A.$ This name stems from the fact that $a \in A^i$ if and only if $\operatorname{aff} A = X$ and $a \in {}^iA$ (where $\operatorname{aff} A = X$ if and only if $\operatorname{aff} (A - A) = X$).

== Relative interior ==
If $A$ is a subset of a topological vector space $X$ then the relative interior of $A$ is the set $\operatorname{rint} A := \operatorname{int}_{\operatorname{aff} A} A.$ That is, it is the topological interior of A in $\operatorname{aff} A,$ which is the smallest affine linear subspace of $X$ containing $A.$ The following set is also useful:
$$\operatorname{ri} A :=
\begin{cases}
\operatorname{rint} A & \text{ if } \operatorname{aff} A \text{ is a closed subspace of } X \text{,} \\
\varnothing & \text{ otherwise}
\end{cases}$$

== Quasi relative interior ==
If $A$ is a subset of a topological vector space $X$ then the quasi relative interior of $A$ is the set $\operatorname{qri} A := \left\{ a \in A : \overline{\operatorname{cone}} (A - a) \text{ is a linear subspace of } X \right\}.$

In a Hausdorff finite dimensional topological vector space, $\operatorname{qri} A = {}^i A = {}^{ic} A = {}^{ib} A.$

== See also ==
- Algebraic closure (convex analysis)
- Bounding point – Mathematical concept related to subsets of vector spaces
- Interior (topology) – Largest open subset of some given set
- Order unit – Element of an ordered vector space
- Quasi-relative interior – Generalization of algebraic interior
- Radial set
- Relative interior – Generalization of topological interior
- Ursescu theorem – Generalization of closed graph, open mapping, and uniform boundedness theorem
