= Closeness (mathematics) =

Concept in topology

Closeness is a basic concept in topology and related areas in mathematics. Intuitively, we say two sets are close if they are arbitrarily near to each other. The concept can be defined naturally in a metric space where a notion of distance between elements of the space is defined, but it can be generalized to topological spaces where we have no concrete way to measure distances.

The closure operator closes a given set by mapping it to a closed set which contains the original set and all points close to it. The concept of closeness is related to limit point.

== Definition ==
Given a metric space $(X,d)$ a point $p$ is called close or near to a set $A$ if

$$d(p,A) = 0$$,

where the distance between a point and a set is defined as
$$d(p, A) := \inf_{a \in A} d(p, a)$$
where inf stands for infimum. Similarly a set $B$ is called close to a set $A$ if
$$d(B,A) = 0$$
where
$$d(B, A) := \inf_{b \in B} d(b, A).$$

== Properties ==
- if a point $p$ is close to a set $A$ and a set $B$ then $A$ and $B$ are close, but the converse is not true.
- closeness between a point and a set is preserved by continuous functions.
- closeness between two sets is preserved by uniformly continuous functions.

== Closeness relation between a point and a set ==
Let $V$ be some set. A relation between the points of $V$ and the subsets of $V$ is a closeness relation if it satisfies the following conditions:

Let $A$ and $B$ be two subsets of $V$ and $p$ a point in $V$.

- If $p \in A$ then $p$ is close to $A$.
- if $p$ is close to $A$ then $A \neq \emptyset$.
- if $p$ is close to $A$ and $B \supset A$ then $p$ is close to $B$.
- if $p$ is close to $A \cup B$ then $p$ is close to $A$ or $p$ is close to $B$.
- if $p$ is close to $A$ and for every point $a \in A$, $a$ is close to $B$, then $p$ is close to $B$.

Topological spaces have a closeness relationship built into them: defining a point $p$ to be close to a subset $A$ if and only if $p$ is in the closure of $A$ satisfies the above conditions. Likewise, given a set with a closeness relation, defining a point $p$ to be in the closure of a subset $A$ if and only if $p$ is close to $A$ satisfies the Kuratowski closure axioms. Thus, defining a closeness relation on a set is exactly equivalent to defining a topology on that set.

== Closeness relation between two sets ==
Let $A$,$B$ and $C$ be sets.

- if $A$ and $B$ are close then $A \neq \emptyset$ and $B \neq \emptyset$.
- if $A$ and $B$ are close then $B$ and $A$ are close.
- if $A$ and $B$ are close and $B \subset C$ then $A$ and $C$ are close.
- if $A$ and $B \cup C$ are close then either $A$ and $B$ are close or $A$ and $C$ are close.
- if $A \cap B \neq \emptyset$ then $A$ and $B$ are close.

== Generalized definition ==
The closeness relation between a set and a point can be generalized to any topological space. Given a topological space and a point $p$, $p$ is called close to a set $A$ if $p \in \operatorname{cl}(A) = \overline A$.

To define a closeness relation between two sets the topological structure is too weak and we have to use a uniform structure. Given a uniform space, sets $A$ and $B$ are called close to each other if they intersect all entourages, that is, for any entourage $U$, $(A\times B)\cap U$ is non-empty.

== See also ==
- Topological space
- Uniform space
