= Proximity space =

Structure describing a notion of "nearness" between subsets

In topology, a proximity space, also called a nearness space, is an axiomatization of the intuitive notion of "nearness" that applies set-to-set, as opposed to the better-known point-to-set notion that characterizes topological spaces.

The concept was described by Frigyes Riesz (1909) but ignored at the time. It was rediscovered and axiomatized by V. A. Efremovič in 1934 under the name of infinitesimal space, but not published until 1951. In the interim, A. D. Wallace (1941) discovered a version of the same concept under the name of separation space.

== Definition ==
A proximity space $(X, \delta)$ is a set $X$ with a relation $\delta$ between subsets of $X$ satisfying the following properties:

For all subsets $A, B, C \subseteq X$

1. $A \;\delta\; B$ implies $B \;\delta\; A$
2. $A \;\delta\; B$ implies $A \neq \varnothing$
3. $A \cap B \neq \varnothing$ implies $A \;\delta\; B$
4. $A \;\delta\; (B \cup C)$ if and only if ($A \;\delta\; B$ or $A \;\delta\; C$)
5. (For all $E,$ $A \;\delta\; E$ or $B \;\delta\; (X \setminus E)$) implies $A \;\delta\; B$

Proximity without the first axiom is called quasi-proximity (but then Axioms 2 and 4 must be stated in a two-sided fashion).

If $A \;\delta\; B$ we say $A$ is near $B$ or $A$ and $B$ are proximal; otherwise we say $A$ and $B$ are apart. We say $B$ is a proximal- or $\delta$-neighborhood of $A,$ written $A \ll B,$ if and only if $A$ and $X \setminus B$ are apart.

The main properties of this set neighborhood relation, listed below, provide an alternative axiomatic characterization of proximity spaces.

For all subsets $A, B, C, D \subseteq X$

1. $X \ll X$
2. $A \ll B$ implies $A \subseteq B$
3. $A \subseteq B \ll C \subseteq D$ implies $A \ll D$
4. ($A \ll B$ and $A \ll C$) implies $A \ll B \cap C$
5. $A \ll B$ implies $X \setminus B \ll X \setminus A$
6. $A \ll B$ implies that there exists some $E$ such that $A \ll E \ll B.$

A proximity space is called separated if $\{ x \} \;\delta\; \{ y \}$ implies $x = y.$

A proximity or proximal map is one that preserves nearness, that is, given $f : (X, \delta) \to \left(X^*, \delta^*\right),$ if $A \;\delta\; B$ in $X,$ then $f[A] \;\delta^*\; f[B]$ in $X^*.$ Equivalently, a map is proximal if the inverse map preserves proximal neighborhoodness. In the same notation, this means if $C \ll^* D$ holds in $X^*,$ then $f^{-1}[C] \ll f^{-1}[D]$ holds in $X.$

== Properties ==
Given a proximity space, one can define a topology by letting $A \mapsto \left\{ x : \{ x \} \;\delta\; A \right\}$ be a Kuratowski closure operator. If the proximity space is separated, the resulting topology is Hausdorff. Proximity maps will be continuous between the induced topologies.

The resulting topology is always completely regular. This can be proven by imitating the usual proofs of Urysohn's lemma, using the last property of proximal neighborhoods to create the infinite increasing chain used in proving the lemma.

Given a compact Hausdorff space, there is a unique proximity space whose corresponding topology is the given topology: $A$ is near $B$ if and only if their closures intersect. More generally, proximities classify the compactifications of a completely regular Hausdorff space.

A uniform space $X$ induces a proximity relation by declaring $A$ is near $B$ if and only if $A \times B$ has nonempty intersection with every entourage. Uniformly continuous maps will then be proximally continuous.

== See also ==
- Cauchy space – Concept in general topology and analysis
- Convergence space – Generalization of the notion of convergence that is found in general topology
- Pretopological space – Generalized topological space
- Uniform space
