= Pretopological space =

Generalized topological space

In general topology, a pretopological space is a generalization of the concept of a topological space. A pretopological space can be defined in terms of either filters or a preclosure operator.

Let $X$ be a set. A neighborhood system for a pretopology on $X$ is a collection of filters $N(x)$, one for each element $x$ of $X$, such that every set in $N(x)$ contains $x$ as a member. Each element of $N(x)$ is called a neighborhood of $x.$ A pretopological space is a set equipped with such a neighborhood system.

A net $x_{\alpha}$ converges to a point $x$ in $X$ if $x_{\alpha}$ is eventually in every neighborhood of $x.$

A pretopological space can also be defined as $(X, \operatorname{cl}),$ a set $X$ with a preclosure operator (Čech closure operator) $\operatorname{cl}.$ The two definitions can be shown to be equivalent as follows: define the closure of a set $S$ in $X$ to be the set of all points $x$ such that some net that converges to $x$ is eventually in $S$. Then that closure operator can be shown to satisfy the axioms of a preclosure operator. Conversely, let a set $S$ be a neighborhood of $x$ if $x$ is not in the closure of the complement of $S$. The set of all such neighborhoods can be shown to be a neighborhood system for a pretopology.

A pretopological space is a topological space when its closure operator is idempotent.

A map $f : (X, \operatorname{cl}) \to (Y, \operatorname{cl}')$ between two pretopological spaces is continuous if, for all subsets $A \subseteq X$, we have
$$f(\operatorname{cl}(A)) \subseteq \operatorname{cl}'(f(A)).$$

== See also ==
- Kuratowski closure axioms – Axioms for defining a topology
- Cauchy space – Concept in general topology and analysis
- Convergence space – Generalization of the notion of convergence that is found in general topology
- Proximity space – Structure describing a notion of "nearness" between subsets
