= Interior (topology) =

Largest open subset of some given set

The point x is an interior point of S. The point y is on the boundary of S.

In mathematics, specifically in topology, the interior of a subset S of a topological space X is the union of all subsets of S that are open in X. A point that is in the interior of S is an interior point of S. The interior of S is the complement of the closure of the complement of S. In this sense interior and closure are dual notions.

The exterior of a set S is the complement of the closure of S; it consists of the points that are in neither the set nor its boundary. The interior, boundary, and exterior of a subset together partition the whole space into three blocks (or fewer when one or more of these is empty).

== Definitions ==
=== Interior point ===
If $S$ is a subset of a Euclidean space, then $x$ is an interior point of $S$ if there exists an open ball centered at $x$ which is completely contained in $S.$ (This is illustrated in the introductory section to this article.)

This definition generalizes to any subset $S$ of a metric space $X$ with metric $d$: $x$ is an interior point of $S$ if there exists a real number $r > 0,$ such that $y$ is in $S$ whenever the distance $d(x, y) < r.$

This definition generalizes to topological spaces by replacing "open ball" with "open set". If $S$ is a subset of a topological space $X$ then $x$ is an interior point of $S$ in $X$ if $x$ is contained in an open subset of $X$ that is completely contained in $S.$ (Equivalently, $x$ is an interior point of $S$ if $S$ is a neighbourhood of $x.$)

=== Interior of a set ===
The interior of a subset $S$ of a topological space $X,$ denoted by $\operatorname{int}_X S$ or $\operatorname{int} S$ or $S^\circ,$ can be defined in any of the following equivalent ways:

1. $\operatorname{int} S$ is the largest open subset of $X$ contained in $S.$
2. $\operatorname{int} S$ is the union of all open sets of $X$ contained in $S.$
3. $\operatorname{int} S$ is the set of all interior points of $S.$

If the space $X$ is understood from context then the shorter notation $\operatorname{int} S$ is usually preferred to $\operatorname{int}_X S.$

== Examples ==
$a$ is an interior point of $M$ because there is an ε-neighbourhood of $a$ which is a subset of $M.$

- In any space, the interior of the empty set is the empty set.
- In any space $X,$ if $S \subseteq X,$ then $\operatorname{int} S \subseteq S.$
- If $X$ is the real line $\Reals$ (with the standard topology), then $\operatorname{int} ([0, 1]) = (0, 1)$ whereas the interior of the set $\Q$ of rational numbers is empty: $\operatorname{int} \Q = \varnothing.$
- If $X$ is the complex plane $\Complex,$ then $\operatorname{int} (\{z \in \Complex : |z| \leq 1\}) = \{z \in \Complex : |z| < 1\}.$
- In any Euclidean space, the interior of any finite set is the empty set.

On the set of real numbers, one can put other topologies rather than the standard one:

- If $X$ is the real numbers $\Reals$ with the lower limit topology, then $\operatorname{int} ([0, 1]) = [0, 1).$
- If one considers on $\Reals$ the topology in which every set is open, then $\operatorname{int} ([0, 1]) = [0, 1].$
- If one considers on $\Reals$ the topology in which the only open sets are the empty set and $\Reals$ itself, then $\operatorname{int} ([0, 1])$ is the empty set.

These examples show that the interior of a set depends upon the topology of the underlying space. The last two examples are special cases of the following.

- In any discrete space, since every set is open, every set is equal to its interior.
- In any indiscrete space $X,$ since the only open sets are the empty set and $X$ itself, $\operatorname{int} X = X$ and for every proper subset $S$ of $X,$ $\operatorname{int} S$ is the empty set.

== Properties ==
Let $X$ be a topological space and let $S$ and $T$ be subsets of $X.$

- $\operatorname{int} S$ is open in $X.$
- If $T$ is open in $X$ then $T \subseteq S$ if and only if $T \subseteq \operatorname{int} S.$
- $\operatorname{int} S$ is an open subset of $S$ when $S$ is given the subspace topology.
- $S$ is an open subset of $X$ if and only if $\operatorname{int} S = S.$
- Intensive: $\operatorname{int} S \subseteq S.$
- Idempotence: $\operatorname{int} (\operatorname{int} S) = \operatorname{int} S.$
- Preserves/distributes over binary intersection: $\operatorname{int} (S \cap T) = (\operatorname{int} S) \cap (\operatorname{int} T).$
  - However, the interior operator does not distribute over unions since only $\operatorname{int} (S \cup T) ~\supseteq~ (\operatorname{int} S) \cup (\operatorname{int} T)$ is guaranteed in general and equality might not hold. (Note: The analogous identity for the closure operator is $\operatorname{cl} (S \cup T) = (\operatorname{cl} S) \cup (\operatorname{cl} T).$ These identities may be remembered with the following mnemonic. Just as the intersection $\cap$ of two open sets is open, so too does the interior operator distribute over intersections $\cap;$ explicitly: $\operatorname{int} (S \cap T) = (\operatorname{int} S) \cap (\operatorname{int} T).$ And similarly, just as the union $\cup$ of two closed sets is closed, so too does the closure operator distribute over unions $\cup;$ explicitly: $\operatorname{cl} (S \cup T) = (\operatorname{cl} S) \cup (\operatorname{cl} T).$) For example, if $X = \Reals, S = (-\infty, 0],$ and $T = (0, \infty)$ then $(\operatorname{int} S) \cup (\operatorname{int} T) = (-\infty, 0) \cup (0, \infty) = \Reals \setminus \{0\}$ is a proper subset of $\operatorname{int} (S \cup T) = \operatorname{int} \Reals = \Reals.$
- Monotone/nondecreasing with respect to $\subseteq$: If $S \subseteq T$ then $\operatorname{int} S \subseteq \operatorname{int} T.$

Other properties include:

- If $S$ is closed in $X$ and $\operatorname{int} T = \varnothing$ then $\operatorname{int} (S \cup T) = \operatorname{int} S.$

Relationship with closure

The above statements will remain true if all instances of the symbols/words

"interior", "int", "open", "subset", and "largest"

are respectively replaced by

"closure", "cl", "closed", "superset", and "smallest"

and the following symbols are swapped:

1. "$\subseteq$" swapped with "$\supseteq$"
2. "$\cup$" swapped with "$\cap$"

For more details on this matter, see interior operator below or the article Kuratowski closure axioms.

== Interior operator ==
The interior operator $\operatorname{int}_X$ is dual to the closure operator, which is denoted by $\operatorname{cl}_X$ or by an overline ^{—}, in the sense that
$$\operatorname{int}_X S = X \setminus \overline{(X \setminus S)}$$
and also
$$\overline{S} = X \setminus \operatorname{int}_X (X \setminus S),$$
where $X$ is the topological space containing $S,$ and the backslash $\,\setminus\,$ denotes set-theoretic difference. Therefore, the abstract theory of closure operators and the Kuratowski closure axioms can be readily translated into the language of interior operators, by replacing sets with their complements in $X.$

In general, the interior operator does not commute with unions. However, in a complete metric space the following result does hold:

Theorem (C. Ursescu)—Let $S_1, S_2, \ldots$ be a sequence of subsets of a complete metric space $X.$

- If each $S_i$ is closed in $X$ then
  $${\operatorname{cl}_X} \biggl( \bigcup_{i \in \N} \operatorname{int}_X S_i \biggr)
= {\operatorname{cl}_X \operatorname{int}_X} \biggl( \bigcup_{i \in \N} S_i \biggr).$$
- If each $S_i$ is open in $X$ then
  $${\operatorname{int}_X} \biggl( \bigcap_{i \in \N} \operatorname{cl}_X S_i \biggr)
= {\operatorname{int}_X \operatorname{cl}_X} \biggl( \bigcap_{i \in \N} S_i \biggr).$$

The result above implies that every complete metric space is a Baire space.

== Exterior of a set ==
The exterior of a subset $S$ of a topological space $X,$ denoted by $\operatorname{ext}_X S$ or simply $\operatorname{ext} S,$ is the largest open set disjoint from $S,$ namely, it is the union of all open sets in $X$ that are disjoint from $S.$ The exterior is the interior of the complement, which is the same as the complement of the closure; in formulas,
$$\operatorname{ext} S = \operatorname{int}(X \setminus S) = X \setminus \overline{S}.$$

Similarly, the interior is the exterior of the complement:
$$\operatorname{int} S = \operatorname{ext}(X \setminus S).$$

The interior, boundary, and exterior of a set $S$ together partition the whole space into three blocks (or fewer when one or more of these is empty):
$$X = \operatorname{int} S \cup \partial S \cup \operatorname{ext} S,$$
where $\partial S$ denotes the boundary of $S.$ The interior and exterior are always open, while the boundary is closed.

Some of the properties of the exterior operator are unlike those of the interior operator:

- The exterior operator reverses inclusions; if $S \subseteq T,$ then $\operatorname{ext} T \subseteq \operatorname{ext} S.$
- The exterior operator is not idempotent. It does have the property that $\operatorname{int} S \subseteq \operatorname{ext}\left(\operatorname{ext} S\right).$

== Interior-disjoint shapes ==
The red shapes are not interior-disjoint with the blue Triangle. The green and the yellow shapes are interior-disjoint with the blue Triangle, but only the yellow shape is entirely disjoint from the blue Triangle.

Two shapes $a$ and $b$ are called interior-disjoint if the intersection of their interiors is empty. Interior-disjoint shapes may or may not intersect in their boundary.

== See also ==
- Algebraic interior – Generalization of topological interior
- DE-9IM – Topological model
- Interior algebra – Algebraic structure
- Jordan curve theorem – Theorem in topology
- Quasi-relative interior – Generalization of algebraic interior
- Relative interior – Generalization of topological interior

== Bibliography ==
- Bourbaki, Nicolas (1989) [1966]. General Topology: Chapters 1–4 [Topologie Générale]. Éléments de mathématique. Berlin New York: Springer Science & Business Media. ISBN 978-3-540-64241-1. OCLC 18588129.
- Dixmier, Jacques (1984). General Topology. Undergraduate Texts in Mathematics. Translated by Berberian, S. K. New York: Springer-Verlag. ISBN 978-0-387-90972-1. OCLC 10277303.
- Császár, Ákos (1978). General topology. Translated by Császár, Klára. Bristol England: Adam Hilger Ltd. ISBN 0-85274-275-4. OCLC 4146011.
- Dugundji, James (1966). Topology. Boston: Allyn and Bacon. ISBN 978-0-697-06889-7. OCLC 395340485.
- Joshi, K. D. (1983). Introduction to General Topology. New York: John Wiley and Sons Ltd. ISBN 978-0-85226-444-7. OCLC 9218750.
- Kelley, John L. (1975) [1955]. General Topology. Graduate Texts in Mathematics. Vol. 27 (2nd ed.). New York: Springer-Verlag. ISBN 978-0-387-90125-1. OCLC 1365153.
- Munkres, James R. (2000). Topology (2nd ed.). Upper Saddle River, NJ: Prentice Hall, Inc. ISBN 978-0-13-181629-9. OCLC 42683260. (accessible to patrons with print disabilities)
- Schubert, Horst (1968). Topology. London: Macdonald & Co. ISBN 978-0-356-02077-8. OCLC 463753.
- Wilansky, Albert (17 October 2008) [1970]. Topology for Analysis. Mineola, New York: Dover Publications, Inc. ISBN 978-0-486-46903-4. OCLC 227923899.
- Willard, Stephen (2004) [1970]. General Topology. Mineola, N.Y.: Dover Publications. ISBN 978-0-486-43479-7. OCLC 115240.
