= Complete topological vector space =

Structure in functional analysis

In functional analysis and related areas of mathematics, a complete topological vector space is a topological vector space (TVS) with the property that whenever points get progressively closer to each other, then there exists some point $x$ towards which they all get closer. The notion of "points that get progressively closer" is made rigorous by Cauchy nets or Cauchy filters, which are generalizations of Cauchy sequences, while "point $x$ towards which they all get closer" means that this Cauchy net or filter converges to $x.$ The notion of completeness for TVSs uses the theory of uniform spaces as a framework to generalize the notion of completeness for metric spaces. But unlike metric-completeness, TVS-completeness does not depend on any metric and is defined for all TVSs, including those that are not metrizable or Hausdorff.

Completeness is an extremely important property for a topological vector space to possess. The notions of completeness for normed spaces and metrizable TVSs, which are commonly defined in terms of completeness of a particular norm or metric, can both be reduced down to this notion of TVS-completeness – a notion that is independent of any particular norm or metric. A metrizable topological vector space $X$ with a translation invariant metric (Note: A metric $D$ on a vector space $X$ is said to be translation invariant if $D(x, y) = D(x + z, y + z)$ for all vectors $x, y, z \in X.$ A metric that is induced by a norm is always translation invariant.) $d$ is complete as a TVS if and only if $(X, d)$ is a complete metric space, which by definition means that every $d$-Cauchy sequence converges to some point in $X.$ Prominent examples of complete TVSs that are also metrizable include all F-spaces and consequently also all Fréchet spaces, Banach spaces, and Hilbert spaces. Prominent examples of complete TVS that are (typically) not metrizable include strict LF-spaces such as the space of test functions $C_c^\infty(U)$ with it canonical LF-topology, the strong dual space of any non-normable Fréchet space, as well as many other polar topologies on continuous dual space or other topologies on spaces of linear maps.

Explicitly, a topological vector spaces (TVS) is complete if every net, or equivalently, every filter, that is Cauchy with respect to the space's canonical uniformity necessarily converges to some point. Said differently, a TVS is complete if its canonical uniformity is a complete uniformity. The canonical uniformity on a TVS $(X, \tau)$ is the unique (Note: Completeness of normed spaces and metrizable TVSs are defined in terms of norms and metrics. In general, many different norms (for example, equivalent norms) and metrics may be used to determine completeness of such space. This stands in contrast to the uniqueness of this translation-invariant canonical uniformity.) translation-invariant uniformity that induces on $X$ the topology $\tau.$ This notion of "TVS-completeness" depends only on vector subtraction and the topology of the TVS; consequently, it can be applied to all TVSs, including those whose topologies can not be defined in terms metrics or pseudometrics. A first-countable TVS is complete if and only if every Cauchy sequence (or equivalently, every elementary Cauchy filter) converges to some point.

Every topological vector space $X,$ even if it is not metrizable or not Hausdorff, has a completion, which by definition is a complete TVS $C$ into which $X$ can be TVS-embedded as a dense vector subspace. Moreover, every Hausdorff TVS has a Hausdorff completion, which is necessarily unique up to TVS-isomorphism. However, as discussed below, all TVSs have infinitely many non-Hausdorff completions that are not TVS-isomorphic to one another.

== Definitions ==
This section summarizes the definition of a complete topological vector space (TVS) in terms of both nets and prefilters. Information about convergence of nets and filters, such as definitions and properties, can be found in the article about filters in topology.

Every topological vector space (TVS) is a commutative topological group with identity under addition and the canonical uniformity of a TVS is defined entirely in terms of subtraction (and thus addition); scalar multiplication is not involved and no additional structure is needed.

=== Canonical uniformity ===
The diagonal of $X$ is the set
$$\Delta_X ~\stackrel{\scriptscriptstyle\text{def}}{=}~ \{(x, x) : x \in X\}$$
and for any $N \subseteq X,$ the canonical entourage/vicinity around $N$ is the set
$$\begin{alignat}{4}
\Delta_X(N)
~&~\stackrel{\scriptscriptstyle\text{def}}{=}~ \{(x, y) \in X \times X ~:~ x - y \in N\} \\
&= \bigcup_{y \in X} [(y + N) \times \{y\}] \\
&= \Delta_X + (N \times \{0\})
\end{alignat}$$
where if $0 \in N$ then $\Delta_X(N)$ contains the diagonal $\Delta_X(\{0\}) = \Delta_X.$

If $N$ is a symmetric set (that is, if $- N = N$), then $\Delta_X(N)$ is symmetric, which by definition means that $\Delta_X(N) = \left(\Delta_X(N)\right)^{\operatorname{op}}$ holds where $\left(\Delta_X(N)\right)^{\operatorname{op}} ~\stackrel{\scriptscriptstyle\text{def}}{=}~ \left\{(y, x) : (x, y) \in \Delta_X(N)\right\},$ and in addition, this symmetric set's composition with itself is:
$$\begin{alignat}{4}
\Delta_X(N) \circ \Delta_X(N)
~&~\stackrel{\scriptscriptstyle\text{def}}{=}~ \left\{(x, z) \in X \times X ~:~ \text{ there exists } y \in X \text{ such that } x, z \in y + N\right\}\\
& = \bigcup_{y \in X} [(y + N) \times (y + N)] \\
&= \Delta_X + (N \times N).
\end{alignat}$$

If $\mathcal{L}$ is any neighborhood basis at the origin in $(X, \tau)$ then the family of subsets of $X \times X:$ $\mathcal{B}_{\mathcal{L}} ~\stackrel{\scriptscriptstyle\text{def}}{=}~ \left\{\Delta_X(N) : N \in \mathcal{L}\right\}$ is a prefilter on $X \times X.$ If $\mathcal{N}_{\tau}(0)$ is the neighborhood filter at the origin in $(X, \tau)$ then $\mathcal{B}_{\mathcal{N}_{\tau}(0)}$ forms a base of entourages for a uniform structure on $X$ that is considered canonical. Explicitly, by definition, the canonical uniformity on $X$ induced by $(X, \tau)$ is the filter $\mathcal{U}_{\tau}$ on $X \times X$ generated by the above prefilter:
$$\mathcal{U}_{\tau} ~\stackrel{\scriptscriptstyle\text{def}}{=}~ \mathcal{B}_{\mathcal{N}_{\tau}(0)}^{\uparrow} ~\stackrel{\scriptscriptstyle\text{def}}{=}~ \left\{S \subseteq X \times X ~:~ \text{there exists } N \in \mathcal{N}_{\tau}(0) \text{ such that } \Delta_X(N) \subseteq S\right\}$$
where $\mathcal{B}_{\mathcal{N}_{\tau}(0)}^{\uparrow}$ denotes the upward closure of $\mathcal{B}_{\mathcal{N}_{\tau}(0)}$ in $X \times X.$ The same canonical uniformity would result by using a neighborhood basis of the origin rather the filter of all neighborhoods of the origin. If $\mathcal{L}$ is any neighborhood basis at the origin in $(X, \tau)$ then the filter on $X \times X$ generated by the prefilter $\mathcal{B}_{\mathcal{L}}$ is equal to the canonical uniformity $\mathcal{U}_{\tau}$ induced by $(X, \tau).$

=== Cauchy net ===
The general theory of uniform spaces has its own definition of a "Cauchy prefilter" and "Cauchy net". For the canonical uniformity on $X,$ these definitions reduce down to those given below.

Suppose $x_{\bull} = \left(x_i\right)_{i \in I}$ is a net in $X$ and $y_{\bull} = \left(y_j\right)_{j \in J}$ is a net in $Y.$ The product $I \times J$ becomes a directed set by declaring $(i, j) \leq \left(i_2, j_2\right)$ if and only if $i \leq i_2$ and $j \leq j_2.$ Then
$$x_{\bull} \times y_{\bull} ~\stackrel{\scriptscriptstyle\text{def}}{=}~ \left(x_i, y_j\right)_{(i, j) \in I \times J}$$
denotes the (Cartesian) product net, where in particular $x_{\bull} \times x_{\bull} ~\stackrel{\scriptscriptstyle\text{def}}{=}~ \left(x_i, x_j\right)_{(i, j) \in I \times I}.$ If $X = Y$ then the image of this net under the vector addition map $X \times X \to X$ denotes the sum of these two nets:
$$x_{\bull} + y_{\bull} ~\stackrel{\scriptscriptstyle\text{def}}{=}~ \left(x_i + y_j\right)_{(i, j) \in I \times J}$$
and similarly their difference is defined to be the image of the product net under the vector subtraction map $(x, y) \mapsto x - y$:
$$x_{\bull} - y_{\bull} ~\stackrel{\scriptscriptstyle\text{def}}{=}~ \left(x_i - y_j\right)_{(i, j) \in I \times J}.$$
In particular, the notation $x_{\bull} - x_{\bull} = \left(x_i\right)_{i \in I} - \left(x_i\right)_{i \in I}$ denotes the $I^2$-indexed net $\left(x_i - x_j\right)_{(i, j) \in I \times I}$ and not the $I$-indexed net $\left(x_i - x_i\right)_{i \in I} = (0)_{i \in I}$ since using the latter as the definition would make the notation useless.

A net $x_{\bull} = \left(x_i\right)_{i \in I}$ in a TVS $X$ is called a Cauchy net if
$$x_{\bull} - x_{\bull} ~\stackrel{\scriptscriptstyle\text{def}}{=}~ \left(x_i - x_j\right)_{(i, j) \in I \times I} \to 0 \quad \text{ in } X.$$
Explicitly, this means that for every neighborhood $N$ of $0$ in $X,$ there exists some index $i_0 \in I$ such that $x_i - x_j \in N$ for all indices $i, j \in I$ that satisfy $i \geq i_0$ and $j \geq i_0.$ It suffices to check any of these defining conditions for any given neighborhood basis of $0$ in $X.$ A Cauchy sequence is a sequence that is also a Cauchy net.

If $x_{\bull} \to x$ then $x_{\bull} \times x_{\bull} \to (x, x)$ in $X \times X$ and so the continuity of the vector subtraction map $S : X \times X \to X,$ which is defined by $S(x, y) ~\stackrel{\scriptscriptstyle\text{def}}{=}~ x - y,$ guarantees that $S\left(x_{\bull} \times x_{\bull}\right) \to S(x, x)$ in $X,$ where $S\left(x_{\bull} \times x_{\bull}\right) = \left(x_i - x_j\right)_{(i, j) \in I \times I} = x_{\bull} - x_{\bull}$ and $S(x, x) = x - x = 0.$ This proves that every convergent net is a Cauchy net. By definition, a space is called complete if the converse is also always true. That is, $X$ is complete if and only if the following holds:

whenever $x_{\bull}$ is a net in $X,$ then $x_{\bull}$ converges (to some point) in $X$ if and only if $x_{\bull} - x_{\bull} \to 0$ in $X.$

A similar characterization of completeness holds if filters and prefilters are used instead of nets.

A series $\sum_{i=1}^{\infty} x_i$ is called a Cauchy series (respectively, a convergent series) if the sequence of partial sums $\left(\sum_{i=1}^n x_i\right)_{n=1}^{\infty}$ is a Cauchy sequence (respectively, a convergent sequence). Every convergent series is necessarily a Cauchy series. In a complete TVS, every Cauchy series is necessarily a convergent series.

=== Cauchy filter and Cauchy prefilter ===
A prefilter $\mathcal{B}$ on a topological vector space $X$ is called a Cauchy prefilter if it satisfies any of the following equivalent conditions:

1. $\mathcal{B} - \mathcal{B} \to 0$ in $X.$
  - The family $\mathcal{B} - \mathcal{B} ~\stackrel{\scriptscriptstyle\text{def}}{=}~ \{B - C : B, C \in \mathcal{B}\}$ is a prefilter.
  - Explicitly, $\mathcal{B} - \mathcal{B} \to 0$ means that for every neighborhood $N$ of the origin in $X,$ there exist $B, C \in \mathcal{B}$ such that $B - C \subseteq N.$
2. $\{B - B : B \in \mathcal{B}\} \to 0$ in $X.$
  - The family $\{B - B : B \in \mathcal{B}\}$ is a prefilter equivalent to $\mathcal{B} - \mathcal{B}$ (equivalence means these prefilters generate the same filter on $X$).
  - Explicitly, $\{B - B : B \in \mathcal{B}\} \to 0$ means that for every neighborhood $N$ of the origin in $X,$ there exists some $B \in \mathcal{B}$ such that $B - B \subseteq N.$
3. For every neighborhood $N$ of the origin in $X,$ $\mathcal{B}$ contains some $N$-small set (that is, there exists some $B \in \mathcal{B}$ such that $B - B \subseteq N$).
  - A subset $B \subseteq X$ is called $N$-small or small of order $N$ if $B - B \subseteq N.$
4. For every neighborhood $N$ of the origin in $X,$ there exists some $x \in X$ and some $B \in \mathcal{B}$ such that $B \subseteq x + N.$
  - This statement remains true if "$B \subseteq x + N$" is replaced with "$x + B \subseteq N.$"
5. Every neighborhood of the origin in $X$ contains some subset of the form $x + B$ where $x \in X$ and $B \in \mathcal{B}.$

It suffices to check any of the above conditions for any given neighborhood basis of $0$ in $X.$ A Cauchy filter is a Cauchy prefilter that is also a filter on $X.$

If $\mathcal{B}$ is a prefilter on a topological vector space $X$ and if $x \in X,$ then $\mathcal{B} \to x$ in $X$ if and only if $x \in \operatorname{cl} \mathcal{B}$ and $\mathcal{B}$ is Cauchy.

=== Complete subset ===
For any $S \subseteq X,$ a prefilter $\mathcal{C}$ on $S$ is necessarily a subset of $\wp(S)$; that is, $\mathcal{C} \subseteq \wp(S).$

A subset $S$ of a TVS $(X, \tau)$ is called a complete subset if it satisfies any of the following equivalent conditions:

1. Every Cauchy prefilter $\mathcal{C} \subseteq \wp(S)$ on $S$ converges to at least one point of $S.$
  - If $X$ is Hausdorff then every prefilter on $S$ will converge to at most one point of $X.$ But if $X$ is not Hausdorff then a prefilter may converge to multiple points in $X.$ The same is true for nets.
2. Every Cauchy net in $S$ converges to at least one point of $S.$
3. $S$ is a complete uniform space (under the point-set topology definition of "complete uniform space") when $S$ is endowed with the uniformity induced on it by the canonical uniformity of $X.$

The subset $S$ is called a sequentially complete subset if every Cauchy sequence in $S$ (or equivalently, every elementary Cauchy filter/prefilter on $S$) converges to at least one point of $S.$

Importantly, convergence to points outside of $S$ does not prevent a set from being complete: If $X$ is not Hausdorff and if every Cauchy prefilter on $S$ converges to some point of $S,$ then $S$ will be complete even if some or all Cauchy prefilters on $S$ also converge to points(s) in $X \setminus S.$ In short, there is no requirement that these Cauchy prefilters on $S$ converge only to points in $S.$ The same can be said of the convergence of Cauchy nets in $S.$

As a consequence, if a TVS $X$ is not Hausdorff then every subset of the closure of $\{0\}$ in $X$ is complete because it is compact and every compact set is necessarily complete. In particular, if $\varnothing \neq S \subseteq \operatorname{cl}_X \{0\}$ is a proper subset, such as $S = \{0\}$ for example, then $S$ would be complete even though every Cauchy net in $S$ (and also every Cauchy prefilter on $S$) converges to every point in $\operatorname{cl}_X \{0\},$ including those points in $\operatorname{cl}_X \{0\}$ that do not belong to $S.$ This example also shows that complete subsets (and indeed, even compact subsets) of a non-Hausdorff TVS may fail to be closed. For example, if $\varnothing \neq S \subseteq \operatorname{cl}_X \{0\}$ then $S = \operatorname{cl}_X \{0\}$ if and only if $S$ is closed in $X.$

=== Complete topological vector space ===
A topological vector space $X$ is called a complete topological vector space if any of the following equivalent conditions are satisfied:

1. $X$ is a complete uniform space when it is endowed with its canonical uniformity.
  - In the general theory of uniform spaces, a uniform space is called a complete uniform space if each Cauchy filter on $X$ converges to some point of $X$ in the topology induced by the uniformity. When $X$ is a TVS, the topology induced by the canonical uniformity is equal to $X$'s given topology (so convergence in this induced topology is just the usual convergence in $X$).
2. $X$ is a complete subset of itself.
3. There exists a neighborhood of the origin in $X$ that is also a complete subset of $X.$
  - This implies that every locally compact TVS is complete (even if the TVS is not Hausdorff).
4. Every Cauchy prefilter $\mathcal{C} \subseteq \wp(X)$ on $X$ converges in $X$ to at least one point of $X.$
  - If $X$ is Hausdorff then every prefilter on $X$ will converge to at most one point of $X.$ But if $X$ is not Hausdorff then a prefilter may converge to multiple points in $X.$ The same is true for nets.
5. Every Cauchy filter on $X$ converges in $X$ to at least one point of $X.$
6. Every Cauchy net in $X$ converges in $X$ to at least one point of $X.$

where if in addition $X$ is pseudometrizable or metrizable (for example, a normed space) then this list can be extended to include:

7. $X$ is sequentially complete.

A topological vector space $X$ is sequentially complete if any of the following equivalent conditions are satisfied:

1. $X$ is a sequentially complete subset of itself.
2. Every Cauchy sequence in $X$ converges in $X$ to at least one point of $X.$
3. Every elementary Cauchy prefilter on $X$ converges in $X$ to at least one point of $X.$
4. Every elementary Cauchy filter on $X$ converges in $X$ to at least one point of $X.$

== Uniqueness of the canonical uniformity ==
The existence of the canonical uniformity was demonstrated above by defining it. The theorem below establishes that the canonical uniformity of any TVS $(X, \tau)$ is the only uniformity on $X$ that is both (1) translation invariant, and (2) generates on $X$ the topology $\tau.$

Theorem (Existence and uniqueness of the canonical uniformity)—The topology of any TVS can be derived from a unique translation-invariant uniformity. If $\mathcal{N}(0)$ is any neighborhood base of the origin, then the family $\left\{\Delta(N) : N \in \mathcal{N}(0)\right\}$ is a base for this uniformity.

This section is dedicated to explaining the precise meanings of the terms involved in this uniqueness statement.

=== Uniform spaces and translation-invariant uniformities ===
For any subsets $\Phi, \Psi \subseteq X \times X,$ let
$$\Phi^{\operatorname{op}} ~\stackrel{\scriptscriptstyle\text{def}}{=}~ \{(y, x) ~:~ (x, y) \in \Phi\}$$
and let
$$\begin{alignat}{4}
\Phi \circ \Psi ~&~\stackrel{\scriptscriptstyle\text{def}}{=}~ \left\{(x, z) : \text{ there exists } y \in X \text{ such that } (x, y) \in \Psi \text{ and } (y, z) \in \Phi\right\} \\
&=~ \bigcup_{y \in X} \{(x, z) ~:~ (x, y) \in \Psi \text{ and } (y, z) \in \Phi\}
\end{alignat}$$
A non-empty family $\mathcal{B} \subseteq \wp(X \times X)$ is called a base of entourages or a fundamental system of entourages if $\mathcal{B}$ is a prefilter on $X \times X$ satisfying all of the following conditions:

1. Every set in $\mathcal{B}$ contains the diagonal of $X$ as a subset; that is, $\Delta_X ~\stackrel{\scriptscriptstyle\text{def}}{=}~ \{(x, x) : x \in X\} \subseteq \Phi$ for every $\Phi \in \mathcal{B}.$ Said differently, the prefilter $\mathcal{B}$ is fixed on $\Delta_X.$
2. For every $\Omega \in \mathcal{B}$ there exists some $\Phi \in \mathcal{B}$ such that $\Phi \circ \Phi \subseteq \Omega.$
3. For every $\Omega \in \mathcal{B}$ there exists some $\Phi \in \mathcal{B}$ such that $\Phi \subseteq \Omega^{\operatorname{op}} ~\stackrel{\scriptscriptstyle\text{def}}{=}~ \{(y, x) : (x, y) \in \Omega\}.$

A uniformity or uniform structure on $X$ is a filter $\mathcal{U}$ on $X \times X$ that is generated by some base of entourages $\mathcal{B},$ in which case we say that $\mathcal{B}$ is a base of entourages for $\mathcal{U}.$

For a commutative additive group $X,$ a translation-invariant fundamental system of entourages is a fundamental system of entourages $\mathcal{B}$ such that for every $\Phi \in \mathcal{B},$ $(x, y) \in \Phi$ if and only if $(x + z, y + z) \in \Phi$ for all $x, y, z \in X.$ A uniformity $\mathcal{B}$ is called a translation-invariant uniformity if it has a base of entourages that is translation-invariant. The canonical uniformity on any TVS is translation-invariant.

The binary operator $\;\circ\;$ satisfies all of the following:

- $(\Phi \circ \Psi)^{\operatorname{op}} = \Psi^{\operatorname{op}} \circ \Phi^{\operatorname{op}}.$
- If $\Phi \subseteq \Phi_2$ and $\Psi \subseteq \Psi_2$ then $\Phi \circ \Psi \subseteq \Phi_2 \circ \Psi_2.$
- Associativity: $\Phi \circ (\Psi \circ \Omega) = (\Phi \circ \Psi) \circ \Omega.$
- Identity: $\Phi \circ \Delta_X = \Phi = \Delta_X \circ \Phi.$
- Zero: $\Phi \circ \varnothing = \varnothing = \varnothing \circ \Phi$

Symmetric entourages

Call a subset $\Phi \subseteq X \times X$ symmetric if $\Phi = \Phi^{\operatorname{op}},$ which is equivalent to $\Phi^{\operatorname{op}} \subseteq \Phi.$ This equivalence follows from the identity $\left(\Phi^{\operatorname{op}}\right)^{\operatorname{op}} = \Phi$ and the fact that if $\Psi \subseteq X \times X,$ then $\Phi \subseteq \Psi$ if and only if $\Phi^{\operatorname{op}} \subseteq \Psi^{\operatorname{op}}.$ For example, the set $\Phi^{\operatorname{op}} \cap \Phi$ is always symmetric for every $\Phi \subseteq X \times X.$ And because $(\Phi \cap \Psi)^{\operatorname{op}} = \Phi^{\operatorname{op}} \cap \Psi^{\operatorname{op}},$ if $\Phi$ and $\Psi$ are symmetric then so is $\Phi \cap \Psi.$

=== Topology generated by a uniformity ===
Relatives

Let $\Phi \subseteq X \times X$ be arbitrary and let $\operatorname{Pr}_1, \operatorname{Pr}_2 : X \times X \to X$ be the canonical projections onto the first and second coordinates, respectively.

For any $S \subseteq X,$ define
$$S \cdot \Phi ~\stackrel{\scriptscriptstyle\text{def}}{=}~ \{y \in X : \Phi \cap (S \times \{x\}) \neq \varnothing\} ~=~ \operatorname{Pr}_2 (\Phi \cap (S \times X))$$
$$\Phi \cdot S ~\stackrel{\scriptscriptstyle\text{def}}{=}~ \{x \in X : \Phi \cap (\{x\} \times S) \neq \varnothing\} ~=~ \operatorname{Pr}_1 (\Phi \cap (X \times S)) = S \cdot \left(\Phi^{\operatorname{op}}\right)$$
where $\Phi \cdot S$ (respectively, $S \cdot \Phi$) is called the set of left (respectively, right) $\Phi$-relatives of (points in) $S.$ Denote the special case where $S = \{p\}$ is a singleton set for some $p \in X$ by:
$$p \cdot \Phi ~\stackrel{\scriptscriptstyle\text{def}}{=}~ \{p\} \cdot \Phi ~=~ \{y \in X : (p, y) \in \Phi\}$$
$$\Phi \cdot p ~\stackrel{\scriptscriptstyle\text{def}}{=}~ \Phi \cdot \{p\} ~=~ \{x \in X : (x, p) \in \Phi\} ~=~ p \cdot \left(\Phi^{\operatorname{op}}\right)$$
If $\Phi, \Psi \subseteq X \times X$ then $(\Phi \circ \Psi) \cdot S = \Phi \cdot (\Psi \cdot S).$ Moreover, $\,\cdot\,$ right distributes over both unions and intersections, meaning that if $R, S \subseteq X$ then $(R \cup S) \cdot \Phi ~=~ (R \cdot \Phi) \cup (S \cdot \Phi)$ and $(R \cap S) \cdot \Phi ~\subseteq~ (R \cdot \Phi) \cap (S \cdot \Phi).$

Neighborhoods and open sets

Two points $x$ and $y$ are $\Phi$-close if $(x, y) \in \Phi$ and a subset $S \subseteq X$ is called $\Phi$-small if $S \times S \subseteq \Phi.$

Let $\mathcal{B} \subseteq \wp(X \times X)$ be a base of entourages on $X.$ The neighborhood prefilter at a point $p \in X$ and, respectively, on a subset $S \subseteq X$ are the families of sets:
$$\mathcal{B} \cdot p ~\stackrel{\scriptscriptstyle\text{def}}{=}~ \mathcal{B} \cdot \{p\} = \{\Phi \cdot p : \Phi \in \mathcal{B}\} \qquad \text{ and } \qquad \mathcal{B} \cdot S ~\stackrel{\scriptscriptstyle\text{def}}{=}~ \{\Phi \cdot S : \Phi \in \mathcal{B}\}$$
and the filters on $X$ that each generates is known as the neighborhood filter of $p$ (respectively, of $S$). Assign to every $x \in X$ the neighborhood prefilter
$$\mathcal{B} \cdot x ~\stackrel{\scriptscriptstyle\text{def}}{=}~ \{\Phi \cdot x : \Phi \in \mathcal{B}\}$$
and use the neighborhood definition of "open set" to obtain a topology on $X$ called the topology induced by $\mathcal{B}$ or the induced topology. Explicitly, a subset $U \subseteq X$ is open in this topology if and only if for every $u \in U$ there exists some $N \in \mathcal{B} \cdot u$ such that $N \subseteq U;$ that is, $U$ is open if and only if for every $u \in U$ there exists some $\Phi \in \mathcal{B}$ such that $\Phi \cdot u ~\stackrel{\scriptscriptstyle\text{def}}{=}~ \{x \in X : (x, u) \in \Phi\} \subseteq U.$

The closure of a subset $S \subseteq X$ in this topology is:
$$\operatorname{cl}_X S = \bigcap_{\Phi \in \mathcal{B}} (\Phi \cdot S) = \bigcap_{\Phi \in \mathcal{B}} (S \cdot \Phi).$$

Cauchy prefilters and complete uniformities

A prefilter $\mathcal{F} \subseteq \wp(X)$ on a uniform space $X$ with uniformity $\mathcal{U}$ is called a Cauchy prefilter if for every entourage $N \in \mathcal{U},$ there exists some $F \in \mathcal{F}$ such that $F \times F \subseteq N.$

A uniform space $(X, \mathcal{U})$ is called a complete uniform space (respectively, a sequentially complete uniform space) if every Cauchy prefilter (respectively, every elementary Cauchy prefilter) on $X$ converges to at least one point of $X$ when $X$ is endowed with the topology induced by $\mathcal{U}.$

Case of a topological vector space

If $(X, \tau)$ is a topological vector space then for any $S \subseteq X$ and $x \in X,$
$$\Delta_X(N) \cdot S = S + N \qquad \text{ and } \qquad \Delta_X(N) \cdot x = x + N,$$
and the topology induced on $X$ by the canonical uniformity is the same as the topology that $X$ started with (that is, it is $\tau$).

== Uniform continuity ==
Let $X$ and $Y$ be TVSs, $D \subseteq X,$ and $f : D \to Y$ be a map. Then $f : D \to Y$ is uniformly continuous if for every neighborhood $U$ of the origin in $X,$ there exists a neighborhood $V$ of the origin in $Y$ such that for all $x, y \in D,$ if $y - x \in U$ then $f(y) - f(x) \in V.$

Suppose that $f : D \to Y$ is uniformly continuous. If $x_{\bull} = \left(x_i\right)_{i \in I}$ is a Cauchy net in $D$ then $f \circ x_{\bull} = \left(f\left(x_i\right)\right)_{i \in I}$ is a Cauchy net in $Y.$ If $\mathcal{B}$ is a Cauchy prefilter in $D$ (meaning that $\mathcal{B}$ is a family of subsets of $D$ that is Cauchy in $X$) then $f\left(\mathcal{B}\right)$ is a Cauchy prefilter in $Y.$ However, if $\mathcal{B}$ is a Cauchy filter on $D$ then although $f\left(\mathcal{B}\right)$ will be a Cauchy prefilter, it will be a Cauchy filter in $Y$ if and only if $f : D \to Y$ is surjective.

== TVS completeness vs completeness of (pseudo)metrics ==
=== Preliminaries: Complete pseudometric spaces ===
We review the basic notions related to the general theory of complete pseudometric spaces. Recall that every metric is a pseudometric and that a pseudometric $p$ is a metric if and only if $p(x, y) = 0$ implies $x = y.$ Thus every metric space is a pseudometric space and a pseudometric space $(X, p)$ is a metric space if and only if $p$ is a metric.

If $S$ is a subset of a pseudometric space $(X, d)$ then the diameter of $S$ is defined to be
$$\operatorname{diam}(S) ~\stackrel{\scriptscriptstyle\text{def}}{=}~ \sup_{} \{d(s, t) : s, t \in S\}.$$

A prefilter $\mathcal{B}$ on a pseudometric space $(X, d)$ is called a $d$-Cauchy prefilter or simply a Cauchy prefilter if for each real $r > 0,$ there is some $B \in \mathcal{B}$ such that the diameter of $B$ is less than $r.$

Suppose $(X, d)$ is a pseudometric space. A net $x_{\bull} = \left(x_i\right)_{i \in I}$ in $X$ is called a $d$-Cauchy net or simply a Cauchy net if $\operatorname{Tails}\left(x_{\bull}\right)$ is a Cauchy prefilter, which happens if and only if

for every $r > 0$ there is some $i \in I$ such that if $j, k \in I$ with $j \geq i$ and $k \geq i$ then $d\left(x_j, x_k\right) < r$

or equivalently, if and only if $\left(d\left(x_j, x_k\right)\right)_{(i,j) \in I \times I} \to 0$ in $\R.$ This is analogous to the following characterization of the converge of $x_{\bull}$ to a point: if $x \in X,$ then $x_{\bull} \to x$ in $(X, d)$ if and only if $\left(x_i, x\right)_{i \in I} \to 0$ in $\R.$

A Cauchy sequence is a sequence that is also a Cauchy net. (Note: Every sequence is also a net.)

Every pseudometric $p$ on a set $X$ induces the usual canonical topology on $X,$ which we'll denote by $\tau_p$; it also induces a canonical uniformity on $X,$ which we'll denote by $\mathcal{U}_p.$ The topology on $X$ induced by the uniformity $\mathcal{U}_p$ is equal to $\tau_p.$ A net $x_{\bull} = \left(x_i\right)_{i \in I}$ in $X$ is Cauchy with respect to $p$ if and only if it is Cauchy with respect to the uniformity $\mathcal{U}_p.$ The pseudometric space $(X, p)$ is a complete (resp. a sequentially complete) pseudometric space if and only if $\left(X, \mathcal{U}_p\right)$ is a complete (resp. a sequentially complete) uniform space. Moreover, the pseudometric space $(X, p)$ (resp. the uniform space $\left(X, \mathcal{U}_p\right)$) is complete if and only if it is sequentially complete.

A pseudometric space $(X, d)$ (for example, a metric space) is called complete and $d$ is called a complete pseudometric if any of the following equivalent conditions hold:

1. Every Cauchy prefilter on $X$ converges to at least one point of $X.$
2. The above statement but with the word "prefilter" replaced by "filter."
3. Every Cauchy net in $X$ converges to at least one point of $X.$
  - If $d$ is a metric on $X$ then any limit point is necessarily unique and the same is true for limits of Cauchy prefilters on $X.$
4. Every Cauchy sequence in $X$ converges to at least one point of $X.$
  - Thus to prove that $(X, d)$ is complete, it suffices to only consider Cauchy sequences in $X$ (and it is not necessary to consider the more general Cauchy nets).
5. The canonical uniformity on $X$ induced by the pseudometric $d$ is a complete uniformity.

And if addition $d$ is a metric then we may add to this list:

6. Every decreasing sequence of closed balls whose diameters shrink to $0$ has non-empty intersection.

=== Complete pseudometrics and complete TVSs ===
Every F-space, and thus also every Fréchet space, Banach space, and Hilbert space is a complete TVS. Note that every F-space is a Baire space but there are normed spaces that are Baire but not Banach.

A pseudometric $d$ on a vector space $X$ is said to be a translation invariant pseudometric if $d(x, y) = d(x + z, y + z)$ for all vectors $x, y, z \in X.$

Suppose $(X, \tau)$ is pseudometrizable TVS (for example, a metrizable TVS) and that $p$ is any pseudometric on $X$ such that the topology on $X$ induced by $p$ is equal to $\tau.$ If $p$ is translation-invariant, then $(X, \tau)$ is a complete TVS if and only if $(X, p)$ is a complete pseudometric space. If $p$ is not translation-invariant, then may be possible for $(X, \tau)$ to be a complete TVS but $(X, p)$ to not be a complete pseudometric space (see this footnote (Note: The normed space $(\R, | \cdot |)$ is a Banach space where the absolute value is a norm that induces the usual Euclidean topology on $\R.$ Define a metric $D$ on $\R$ by $D(x, y) = \left|\arctan(x) - \arctan(y)\right|$ for all $x, y \in \R,$ where one may show that $D$ induces the usual Euclidean topology on $\R.$ However, $D$ is not a complete metric since the sequence $x_{\bull} = \left(x_i\right)_{i=1}^{\infty}$ defined by $x_i = i$ is a $D$-Cauchy sequence that does not converge in $\R$ to any point of $\R.$ Note also that this $D$-Cauchy sequence is not a Cauchy sequence in $(\R, | \cdot |)$ (that is, it is not a Cauchy sequence with respect to the norm $| \cdot |$).) for an example).

Theorem (Klee)—Let $d$ be any (Note: Not assumed to be translation-invariant.) metric on a vector space $X$ such that the topology $\tau$ induced by $d$ on $X$ makes $(X, \tau)$ into a topological vector space. If $(X, d)$ is a complete metric space then $(X, \tau)$ is a complete-TVS.

=== Complete norms and equivalent norms ===
Two norms on a vector space are called equivalent if and only if they induce the same topology. If $p$ and $q$ are two equivalent norms on a vector space $X$ then the normed space $(X, p)$ is a Banach space if and only if $(X, q)$ is a Banach space. See this footnote for an example of a continuous norm on a Banach space that is not equivalent to that Banach space's given norm. (Note: Let $\left(C([0, 1]), \| \cdot \|_{\infty}\right)$ denotes the Banach space of continuous functions with the supremum norm, let $X = C([0, 1])$ where $X$ is given the topology induced by $\| \cdot \|_{\infty},$ and denote the restriction of the L^{1}-norm to $C([0, 1])$ by $\| \cdot \|_1.$ Then one may show that $\| \cdot \|_1 \leq \| \cdot \|_{\infty}$ so that the norm $\| \cdot \|_1 : X \to \R$ is a continuous function. However, $\| \cdot \|_1$ is not equivalent to the norm $\| \cdot \|_{\infty}$ and so in particular, $\left(C([0, 1]), \| \cdot \|_1\right)$ is not a Banach space.) All norms on a finite-dimensional vector space are equivalent and every finite-dimensional normed space is a Banach space. Every Banach space is a complete TVS. A normed space is a Banach space (that is, its canonical norm-induced metric is complete) if and only if it is complete as a topological vector space.

== Completions ==
A completion of a TVS $X$ is a complete TVS that contains a dense vector subspace that is TVS-isomorphic to $X.$ In other words, it is a complete TVS $C$ into which $X$ can be TVS-embedded as a dense vector subspace. Every TVS-embedding is a uniform embedding.

Every topological vector space has a completion. Moreover, every Hausdorff TVS has a Hausdorff completion, which is necessarily unique up to TVS-isomorphism. However, all TVSs, even those that are Hausdorff, (already) complete, and/or metrizable have infinitely many non-Hausdorff completions that are not TVS-isomorphic to one another.

=== Examples of completions ===
For example, the vector space consisting of scalar-valued simple functions $f$ for which $|f|_p < \infty$ (where this seminorm is defined in the usual way in terms of Lebesgue integration) becomes a seminormed space when endowed with this seminorm, which in turn makes it into both a pseudometric space and a non-Hausdorff non-complete TVS; any completion of this space is a non-Hausdorff complete seminormed space that when quotiented by the closure of its origin (so as to obtain a Hausdorff TVS) results in (a space linearly isometrically-isomorphic to) the usual complete Hausdorff $L^p$-space (endowed with the usual complete $\| \cdot \|_p$ norm).

As another example demonstrating the usefulness of completions, the completions of topological tensor products, such as projective tensor products or injective tensor products, of the Banach space $\ell^1(S)$ with a complete Hausdorff locally convex TVS $Y$ results in a complete TVS that is TVS-isomorphic to a "generalized" $\ell^1(S; Y)$-space consisting $Y$-valued functions on $S$ (where this "generalized" TVS is defined analogously to original space $\ell^1(S)$ of scalar-valued functions on $S$). Similarly, the completion of the injective tensor product of the space of scalar-valued $C^k$-test functions with such a TVS $Y$ is TVS-isomorphic to the analogously defined TVS of $Y$-valued $C^k$ test functions.

=== Non-uniqueness of all completions ===
As the example below shows, regardless of whether or not a space is Hausdorff or already complete, every topological vector space (TVS) has infinitely many non-isomorphic completions.

However, every Hausdorff TVS has a Hausdorff completion that is unique up to TVS-isomorphism. But nevertheless, every Hausdorff TVS still has infinitely many non-isomorphic non-Hausdorff completions.

Example (Non-uniqueness of completions): Let $C$ denote any complete TVS and let $I$ denote any TVS endowed with the indiscrete topology, which recall makes $I$ into a complete TVS. Since both $I$ and $C$ are complete TVSs, so is their product $I \times C.$ If $U$ and $V$ are non-empty open subsets of $I$ and $C,$ respectively, then $U = I$ and $(U \times V) \cap (\{0\} \times C) = \{0\} \times V \neq \varnothing,$ which shows that $\{0\} \times C$ is a dense subspace of $I \times C.$ Thus by definition of "completion," $I \times C$ is a completion of $\{0\} \times C$ (it doesn't matter that $\{0\} \times C$ is already complete). So by identifying $\{0\} \times C$ with $C,$ if $X \subseteq C$ is a dense vector subspace of $C,$ then $X$ has both $C$ and $I \times C$ as completions.

=== Hausdorff completions ===
Every Hausdorff TVS has a Hausdorff completion that is unique up to TVS-isomorphism. But nevertheless, as shown above, every Hausdorff TVS still has infinitely many non-isomorphic non-Hausdorff completions.

Properties of Hausdorff completions—Suppose that $X$ and $C$ are Hausdorff TVSs with $C$ complete. Suppose that $E : X \to C$ is a TVS-embedding onto a dense vector subspace of $C.$ Then

Universal property: for every continuous linear map $f : X \to Z$ into a complete Hausdorff TVS $Z,$ there exists a unique continuous linear map $F : C \to Z$ such that $f = F \circ E.$

If $E_2 : X \to C_2$ is a TVS embedding onto a dense vector subspace of a complete Hausdorff TVS $C_2$ having the above universal property, then there exists a unique (bijective) TVS-isomorphism $I : C \to C_2$ such that $E_2 = I \circ E.$

Corollary—Suppose $C$ is a complete Hausdorff TVS and $X$ is a dense vector subspace of $C.$ Then every continuous linear map $f : X \to Z$ into a complete Hausdorff TVS $Z$ has a unique continuous linear extension to a map $C \to Z.$

Existence of Hausdorff completions

A Cauchy filter $\mathcal{B}$ on a TVS $X$ is called a minimal Cauchy filter if there does not exist a Cauchy filter on $X$ that is strictly coarser than $\mathcal{B}$ (that is, "strictly coarser than $\mathcal{B}$" means contained as a proper subset of $\mathcal{B}$).

If $\mathcal{B}$ is a Cauchy filter on $X$ then the filter generated by the following prefilter:
$$\left\{B + N ~:~ B \in \mathcal{B} \text{ and } N \text{ is a neighborhood of } 0 \text{ in } X\right\}$$
is the unique minimal Cauchy filter on $X$ that is contained as a subset of $\mathcal{B}.$ In particular, for any $x \in X,$ the neighborhood filter at $x$ is a minimal Cauchy filter.

Let $\mathbb{M}$ be the set of all minimal Cauchy filters on $X$ and let $E : X \rarr \mathbb{M}$ be the map defined by sending $x \in X$ to the neighborhood filter of $x$ in $X.$ Endow $\mathbb{M}$ with the following vector space structure: Given $\mathcal{B}, \mathcal{C} \in \mathbb{M}$ and a scalar $s,$ let $\mathcal{B} + \mathcal{C}$ (resp. $s \mathcal{B}$) denote the unique minimal Cauchy filter contained in the filter generated by $\left\{B + C : B \in \mathcal{B}, C \in \mathcal{C}\right\}$ (resp. $\{s B : B \in \mathcal{B}\}$).

For every balanced neighborhood $N$ of the origin in $X,$ let
$$\mathbb{U}(N) ~\stackrel{\scriptscriptstyle\text{def}}{=}~ \left\{\mathcal{B} \in \mathbb{M} ~:~ \text{ there exist } B \in \mathcal{B} \text{ and a neighborhood } V \text{ of the origin in } X \text{ such that } B + V \subseteq N\right\}$$

If $X$ is Hausdorff then the collection of all sets $\mathbb{U}(N),$ as $N$ ranges over all balanced neighborhoods of the origin in $X,$ forms a vector topology on $\mathbb{M}$ making $\mathbb{M}$ into a complete Hausdorff TVS. Moreover, the map $E : X \rarr \mathbb{M}$ is a TVS-embedding onto a dense vector subspace of $\mathbb{M}.$

If $X$ is a metrizable TVS then a Hausdorff completion of $X$ can be constructed using equivalence classes of Cauchy sequences instead of minimal Cauchy filters.

=== Non-Hausdorff completions ===
This subsection details how every non-Hausdorff TVS $X$ can be TVS-embedded onto a dense vector subspace of a complete TVS. The proof that every Hausdorff TVS has a Hausdorff completion is widely available and so this fact will be used (without proof) to show that every non-Hausdorff TVS also has a completion. These details are sometimes useful for extending results from Hausdorff TVSs to non-Hausdorff TVSs.

Let $I = \operatorname{cl} \{0\}$ denote the closure of the origin in $X,$ where $I$ is endowed with its subspace topology induced by $X$ (so that $I$ has the indiscrete topology). Since $I$ has the trivial topology, it is easily shown that every vector subspace of $X$ that is an algebraic complement of $I$ in $X$ is necessarily a topological complement of $I$ in $X.$ Let $H$ denote any topological complement of $I$ in $X,$ which is necessarily a Hausdorff TVS (since it is TVS-isomorphic to the quotient TVS $X / I$ (Note: This particular quotient map $q : X \to X / I$ is in fact also a closed map.)). Since $X$ is the topological direct sum of $I$ and $H$ (which means that $X = I \oplus H$ in the category of TVSs), the canonical map
$$I \times H \to I \oplus H = X \quad \text{ given by } \quad (x, y) \mapsto x + y$$
is a TVS-isomorphism. Let $A ~:~ X = I \oplus H ~\to~ I \times H$ denote the inverse of this canonical map. (As a side note, it follows that every open and every closed subset $U$ of $X$ satisfies $U = I + U.$ (Note: Let $W$ be a neighborhood of the origin in $X.$ Since $A(W)$ is a neighborhood of $0$ in $I \times H,$ there exists an open (resp. closed) neighborhood $V$ of $0$ in $H$ such that $I \times V \subseteq A(W)$ is a neighborhood of the origin. Clearly, $V$ is open (resp. closed) if and only if $I \times V$ is open (resp. closed). Let $U = I + V$ so that $A(U) = I \times V \subseteq A(W)$ where $U$ is open (resp. closed) if and only if $V$ is open (resp. closed).))

The Hausdorff TVS $H$ can be TVS-embedded, say via the map $\operatorname{In}_H : H \to C,$ onto a dense vector subspace of its completion $C.$ Since $I$ and $C$ are complete, so is their product $I \times C.$ Let $\operatorname{Id}_I : I \to I$ denote the identity map and observe that the product map $\operatorname{Id}_I \times \operatorname{In}_H : I \times H \to I \times C$ is a TVS-embedding whose image is dense in $I \times C.$ Define the map (Note: Explicitly, this map is defined as follows: for each $x \in X,$ let $(i, h) = A(x)$ and so that $B(x) ~\stackrel{\scriptscriptstyle\text{def}}{=}~ \left(i, \operatorname{In}_H h\right).$ Then $B(i + h) = \left(i, \operatorname{In}_H h\right)$ holds for all $i \in I$ and $h \in H.$)
$$B : X = I \oplus H \to I \times C \quad \text{ by } \quad B ~\stackrel{\scriptscriptstyle\text{def}}{=}~ \left(\operatorname{Id}_I \times \operatorname{In}_H\right) \circ A$$
which is a TVS-embedding of $X = I \oplus H$ onto a dense vector subspace of the complete TVS $I \times C.$ Moreover, observe that the closure of the origin in $I \times C$ is equal to $I \times \{0\},$ and that $I \times \{0\}$ and $\{0\} \times C$ are topological complements in $I \times C.$

To summarize, given any algebraic (and thus topological) complement $H$ of $I ~\stackrel{\scriptscriptstyle\text{def}}{=}~ \operatorname{cl} \{0\}$ in $X$ and given any completion $C$ of the Hausdorff TVS $H$ such that $H \subseteq C,$ then the natural inclusion
$$\operatorname{In}_H : X = I \oplus H \to I \oplus C$$
is a well-defined TVS-embedding of $X$ onto a dense vector subspace of the complete TVS $I \oplus C$ where moreover,
$$X = I \oplus H \subseteq I \oplus C \cong I \times C.$$

=== Topology of a completion ===
Theorem (Topology of a completion)—Let $C$ be a complete TVS and let $X$ be a dense vector subspace of $X.$ If $\mathcal{N}_X(0)$ is any neighborhood base of the origin in $X$ then the set
$$\mathcal{N}_X(0) ~\stackrel{\scriptscriptstyle\text{def}}{=}~ \left\{\operatorname{cl}_C N ~:~ N \in \mathcal{N}_X (0)\right\}$$
is a neighborhood of the origin in the completion $C$ of $X.$

If $X$ is locally convex and $\mathcal{P}$ is a family of continuous seminorms on $X$ that generate the topology of $X,$ then the family of all continuous extensions to $C$ of all members of $\mathcal{P}$ is a generating family of seminorms for $C.$

Said differently, if $C$ is a completion of a TVS $X$ with $X \subseteq C$ and if $\mathcal{N}$ is a neighborhood base of the origin in $X,$ then the family of sets
$$\left\{\operatorname{cl}_C N ~:~ N \in \mathcal{N}\right\}$$
is a neighborhood basis at the origin in $C.$

Theorem (Completions of quotients)—Let $M$ be a metrizable topological vector space and let $N$ be a closed vector subspace of $M.$ Suppose that $C$ is a completion of $M.$ Then the completion of $M / N$ is TVS-isomorphic to $C / \operatorname{cl}_C N.$ If in addition $M$ is a normed space, then this TVS-isomorphism is also an isometry.

Grothendieck's Completeness Theorem

Let $\mathcal{E}$ denote the equicontinuous compactology on the continuous dual space $X^\prime,$ which by definition consists of all equicontinuous weak-* closed and weak-* bounded absolutely convex subsets of $X^\prime$ (which are necessarily weak-* compact subsets of $X^\prime$). Assume that every $E^\prime \in \mathcal{E}$ is endowed with the weak-* topology. A filter $\mathcal{B}$ on $X^\prime$ is said to converge continuously to $x^\prime \in X^\prime$ if there exists some $E^\prime \in \mathcal{E} \cap \mathcal{B}$ containing $x^\prime$ (that is, $x^\prime \in E^\prime$) such that the trace of $\mathcal{B}$ on $E^\prime,$ which is the family $\mathcal{B}\big\vert_{E^\prime} ~\stackrel{\scriptscriptstyle\text{def}}{=}~ \left\{B \cap E^\prime : B \in \mathcal{B}\right\},$ converges to $x^\prime$ in $E^\prime$ (that is, if $\mathcal{B}\big\vert_{E^\prime} \to x^\prime$ in the given weak-* topology). The filter $\mathcal{B}$ converges continuously to $x^\prime$ if and only if $\mathcal{B} - x^\prime$ converges continuously to the origin, which happens if and only if for every $x \in X,$ the filter $\langle \mathcal{B}, x + \mathcal{N} \rangle \to \langle x^\prime, x\rangle$ in the scalar field (which is $\R$ or $\Complex$) where $\mathcal{N}$ denotes any neighborhood basis at the origin in $X,$ $\langle \cdot, \cdot \rangle$ denotes the duality pairing, and $\langle \mathcal{B}, x + \mathcal{N} \rangle$ denotes the filter generated by $\{\langle B, x + N \rangle ~:~ B \in \mathcal{B}, N \in \mathcal{N}\}.$ A map $f : X^\prime \to T$ into a topological space (such as $\R$ or $\Complex$) is said to be $\gamma$-continuous if whenever a filter $\mathcal{B}$ on $X^\prime$ converges continuously to $x^\prime \in X^\prime,$ then $f(\mathcal{B}) \to f\left(x^\prime\right).$

Grothendieck's Completeness Theorem—If $X$ is a Hausdorff topological vector space then its completion is linearly isomorphic to the set of all $\gamma$-continuous linear functions on $X^\prime.$

=== Properties preserved by completions ===
If a TVS $X$ has any of the following properties then so does its completion:

- Hausdorff
- Locally convex
- Pseudometrizable
- Metrizable
- Seminormable
- Normable
  - Moreover, if $(X, p)$ is a normed space, then the completion can be chosen to be a Banach space $(B, q)$ such that the TVS-embedding of $(X, p)$ into $(B, q)$ is an isometry.
- Hausdorff pre-Hilbert. That is, a TVS induced by an inner product.
- Nuclear
- Barrelled
- Mackey
- DF-space

Completions of Hilbert spaces

Every inner product space $\left(H, \langle \cdot, \cdot \rangle\right)$ has a completion $\left(\overline{H}, \langle \cdot, \cdot \rangle_{\overline{H}}\right)$ that is a Hilbert space, where the inner product $\langle \cdot, \cdot \rangle_{\overline{H}}$ is the unique continuous extension to $\overline{H}$ of the original inner product $\langle \cdot, \cdot \rangle.$ The norm induced by $\left(\overline{H}, \langle \cdot, \cdot \rangle_{\overline{H}}\right)$ is also the unique continuous extension to $\overline{H}$ of the norm induced by $\langle \cdot, \cdot \rangle.$

Other preserved properties

If $X$ is a Hausdorff TVS, then the continuous dual space of $X$ is identical to the continuous dual space of the completion of $X.$ The completion of a locally convex bornological space is a barrelled space. If $X$ and $Y$ are DF-spaces then the projective tensor product, as well as its completion, of these spaces is a DF-space.

The completion of the projective tensor product of two nuclear spaces is nuclear. The completion of a nuclear space is TVS-isomorphic with a projective limit of Hilbert spaces.

If $X = Y \oplus Z$ (meaning that the addition map $Y \times Z \to X$ is a TVS-isomorphism) has a Hausdorff completion $C$ then $\left(\operatorname{cl}_C Y\right) + \left(\operatorname{cl}_C Z\right) = C.$ If in addition $X$ is an inner product space and $Y$ and $Z$ are orthogonal complements of each other in $X$ (that is, $\langle Y, Z \rangle = \{0\}$), then $\operatorname{cl}_C Y$ and $\operatorname{cl}_C Z$ are orthogonal complements in the Hilbert space $C.$

=== Properties of maps preserved by extensions to a completion ===
If $f : X \to Y$ is a nuclear linear operator between two locally convex spaces and if $C$ be a completion of $X$ then $f$ has a unique continuous linear extension to a nuclear linear operator $F : C \to Y.$

Let $X$ and $Y$ be two Hausdorff TVSs with $Y$ complete. Let $C$ be a completion of $X.$ Let $L(X; Y)$ denote the vector space of continuous linear operators and let $I : L(X; Y) \to L(C; Y)$ denote the map that sends every $f \in L(X; Y)$ to its unique continuous linear extension on $C.$ Then $I : L(X; Y) \to L(C; Y)$ is a (surjective) vector space isomorphism. Moreover, $I : L(X; Y) \to L(C; Y)$ maps families of equicontinuous subsets onto each other. Suppose that $L(X; Y)$ is endowed with a $\mathcal{G}$-topology and that $\mathcal{H}$ denotes the closures in $C$ of sets in $\mathcal{G}.$ Then the map $I : L_{\mathcal{G}}(X; Y) \to L_{\mathcal{H}}(C; Y)$ is also a TVS-isomorphism.

== Examples and sufficient conditions for a complete TVS ==
Theorem— Let $d$ be any (not assumed to be translation-invariant) metric on a vector space $X$ such that the topology $\tau$ induced by $d$ on $X$ makes $(X, \tau)$ into a topological vector space. If $(X, d)$ is a complete metric space then $(X, \tau)$ is a complete-TVS.

- Any TVS endowed with the trivial topology is complete and every one of its subsets is complete. Moreover, every TVS with the trivial topology is compact and hence locally compact. Thus a complete seminormable locally convex and locally compact TVS need not be finite-dimensional if it is not Hausdorff.
- An arbitrary product of complete (resp. sequentially complete, quasi-complete) TVSs has that same property. If all spaces are Hausdorff, then the converses are also true. A product of Hausdorff completions of a family of (Hausdorff) TVSs is a Hausdorff completion of their product TVS. More generally, an arbitrary product of complete subsets of a family of TVSs is a complete subset of the product TVS.
- The projective limit of a projective system of Hausdorff complete (resp. sequentially complete, quasi-complete) TVSs has that same property. A projective limit of Hausdorff completions of an inverse system of (Hausdorff) TVSs is a Hausdorff completion of their projective limit.
- If $M$ is a closed vector subspace of a complete pseudometrizable TVS $X,$ then the quotient space $X / M$ is complete.
- Suppose $M$ is a complete vector subspace of a metrizable TVS $X.$ If the quotient space $X / M$ is complete then so is $X.$ However, there exists a complete TVS $X$ having a closed vector subspace $M$ such that the quotient TVS $X / M$ is not complete.
- Every F-space, Fréchet space, Banach space, and Hilbert space is a complete TVS.
- Strict LF-spaces and strict LB-spaces are complete.
- Suppose that $D$ is a dense subset of a TVS $X.$ If every Cauchy filter on $D$ converges to some point in $X$ then $X$ is complete.
- The Schwartz space of smooth functions is complete.
- The spaces of distributions and test functions is complete.
- Suppose that $X$ and $Y$ are locally convex TVSs and that the space of continuous linear maps $L_b(X; Y)$ is endowed with the topology of uniform convergence on bounded subsets of $X.$ If $X$ is a bornological space and if $Y$ is complete then $L_b(X; Y)$ is a complete TVS. In particular, the strong dual of a bornological space is complete. However, it need not be bornological.
- Every quasi-complete DF-space is complete.
- Let $\omega$ and $\tau$ be Hausdorff TVS topologies on a vector space $X$ such that $\omega \subseteq \tau.$ If there exists a prefilter $\mathcal{B}$ such that $\mathcal{B}$ is a neighborhood basis at the origin for $(X, \tau)$ and such that every $B \in \mathcal{B}$ is a complete subset of $(X, \omega),$ then $(X, \tau)$ is a complete TVS.

== Properties ==
=== Complete TVSs ===
Every TVS has a completion and every Hausdorff TVS has a Hausdorff completion. Every complete TVS is quasi-complete space and sequentially complete. However, the converses of the above implications are generally false. There exists a sequentially complete locally convex TVS that is not quasi-complete.

If a TVS has a complete neighborhood of the origin then it is complete. Every complete pseudometrizable TVS is a barrelled space and a Baire space (and thus non-meager). The dimension of a complete metrizable TVS is either finite or uncountable.

=== Cauchy nets and prefilters ===
Any neighborhood basis of any point in a TVS is a Cauchy prefilter.

Every convergent net (respectively, prefilter) in a TVS is necessarily a Cauchy net (respectively, a Cauchy prefilter). Any prefilter that is subordinate to (that is, finer than) a Cauchy prefilter is necessarily also a Cauchy prefilter and any prefilter finer than a Cauchy prefilter is also a Cauchy prefilter. The filter associated with a sequence in a TVS is Cauchy if and only if the sequence is a Cauchy sequence. Every convergent prefilter is a Cauchy prefilter.

If $X$ is a TVS and if $x \in X$ is a cluster point of a Cauchy net (respectively, Cauchy prefilter), then that Cauchy net (respectively, that Cauchy prefilter) converges to $x$ in $X.$ If a Cauchy filter in a TVS has an accumulation point $x$ then it converges to $x.$

Uniformly continuous maps send Cauchy nets to Cauchy nets. A Cauchy sequence in a Hausdorff TVS $X,$ when considered as a set, is not necessarily relatively compact (that is, its closure in $X$ is not necessarily compact (Note: If $X$ is a normable TVS such that for every Cauchy sequence $x_{\bull} = \left(x_i\right)_{i=1}^{\infty},$ the closure of $S ~\stackrel{\scriptscriptstyle\text{def}}{=}~ \{x_1, x_2, \ldots,\}$ in $X$ is compact (and thus sequentially compact) then this guarantees that there always exist some $x \in \operatorname{cl}_X S$ such that $x_{\bull} \to x$ in $X.$ Thus any normed space with this property is necessarily sequentially complete. Since not all normed spaces are complete, the closure of a Cauchy sequence is not necessarily compact.)) although it is precompact (that is, its closure in the completion of $X$ is compact).

Every Cauchy sequence is a bounded subset but this is not necessarily true of Cauchy net. For example, let $\N$ have it usual order, let $\,\leq\,$ denote any preorder on the non-indiscrete TVS $X$ (that is, $X$ does not have the trivial topology; it is also assumed that $X \cap \N = \varnothing$) and extend these two preorders to the union $I ~\stackrel{\scriptscriptstyle\text{def}}{=}~ X \cup \N$ by declaring that $x \leq n$ holds for every $x \in X$ and $n \in \N.$ Let $f : I \to X$ be defined by $f(i) = i$ if $i \in X$ and $f(i) = 0$ otherwise (that is, if $i \in \N$), which is a net in $X$ since the preordered set $(I, \leq)$ is directed (this preorder on $I$ is also partial order (respectively, a total order) if this is true of $(X, \leq)$). This net $f$ is a Cauchy net in $X$ because it converges to the origin, but the set $\{f(i) : i \in I\} = X$ is not a bounded subset of $X$ (because $X$ does not have the trivial topology).

Suppose that $X_{\bull} = \left(X_i\right)_{i \in I}$ is a family of TVSs and that $X$ denotes the product of these TVSs. Suppose that for every index $i,$ $\mathcal{B}_i$ is a prefilter on $X_i.$ Then the product of this family of prefilters is a Cauchy filter on $X$ if and only if each $\mathcal{B}_i$ is a Cauchy filter on $X_i.$

=== Maps ===
If $f : X \to Y$ is an injective topological homomorphism from a complete TVS into a Hausdorff TVS then the image of $f$ (that is, $f(X)$) is a closed subspace of $Y.$ If $f : X \to Y$ is a topological homomorphism from a complete metrizable TVS into a Hausdorff TVS then the range of $f$ is a closed subspace of $Y.$ If $f : X \to Y$ is a uniformly continuous map between two Hausdorff TVSs then the image under $f$ of a totally bounded subset of $X$ is a totally bounded subset of $Y.$

Uniformly continuous extensions

Suppose that $f : D \to Y$ is a uniformly continuous map from a dense subset $D$ of a TVS $X$ into a complete Hausdorff TVS $Y.$ Then $f$ has a unique uniformly continuous extension to all of $X.$ If in addition $f$ is a homomorphism then its unique uniformly continuous extension is also a homomorphism. This remains true if "TVS" is replaced by "commutative topological group." The map $f$ is not required to be a linear map and that $D$ is not required to be a vector subspace of $X.$

Uniformly continuous linear extensions

Suppose $f : X \to Y$ be a continuous linear operator between two Hausdorff TVSs. If $M$ is a dense vector subspace of $X$ and if the restriction $f\big\vert_M : M \to Y$ to $M$ is a topological homomorphism then $f : X \to Y$ is also a topological homomorphism. So if $C$ and $D$ are Hausdorff completions of $X$ and $Y,$ respectively, and if $f : X \to Y$ is a topological homomorphism, then $f$'s unique continuous linear extension $F : C \to D$ is a topological homomorphism. (Note that it's possible for $f : X \to Y$ to be surjective but for $F : C \to D$ to not be injective.)

Suppose $X$ and $Y$ are Hausdorff TVSs, $M$ is a dense vector subspace of $X,$ and $N$ is a dense vector subspaces of $Y.$ If $M$ are and $N$ are topologically isomorphic additive subgroups via a topological homomorphism $f$ then the same is true of $X$ and $Y$ via the unique uniformly continuous extension of $f$ (which is also a homeomorphism).

=== Subsets ===
Complete subsets

Every complete subset of a TVS is sequentially complete. A complete subset of a Hausdorff TVS $X$ is a closed subset of $X.$

Every compact subset of a TVS is complete (even if the TVS is not Hausdorff or not complete). Closed subsets of a complete TVS are complete; however, if a TVS $X$ is not complete then $X$ is a closed subset of $X$ that is not complete. The empty set is complete subset of every TVS. If $C$ is a complete subset of a TVS (the TVS is not necessarily Hausdorff or complete) then any subset of $C$ that is closed in $C$ is complete.

Topological complements

If $X$ is a non-normable Fréchet space on which there exists a continuous norm then $X$ contains a closed vector subspace that has no topological complement. If $X$ is a complete TVS and $M$ is a closed vector subspace of $X$ such that $X / M$ is not complete, then $H$ does not have a topological complement in $X.$

Subsets of completions

Let $M$ be a separable locally convex metrizable topological vector space and let $C$ be its completion. If $S$ is a bounded subset of $C$ then there exists a bounded subset $R$ of $X$ such that $S \subseteq \operatorname{cl}_C R.$

Relation to compact subsets

A subset of a TVS (not assumed to be Hausdorff or complete) is compact if and only if it is complete and totally bounded. (Note: Suppose $S$ is compact in $X$ and let $\mathcal{C}$ be a Cauchy filter on $S.$ Let $\mathcal{D} = \left\{\operatorname{cl}_S C ~:~ C \in \mathcal{C}\right\}$ so that $\mathcal{D}$ is a Cauchy filter of closed sets. Since $\mathcal{D}$ has the finite intersection property, there exists some $s \in S$ such that $s \operatorname{cl}_S C$ for all $C \in \mathcal{C}$ so {$s \in \operatorname{cl} \mathcal{C}$ (that is, $s$ is an accumulation point of $\mathcal{C}$). Since $\mathcal{C}$ is Cauchy, $\mathcal{C} \to x$ in $S.$ Thus $S$ is complete. That $S$ is also totally bounded follows immediately from the compactness of $S.$) Thus a closed and totally bounded subset of a complete TVS is compact.

In a Hausdorff locally convex TVS, the convex hull of a precompact set is again precompact. Consequently, in a complete locally convex Hausdorff TVS, the closed convex hull of a compact subset is again compact.

The convex hull of compact subset of a Hilbert space is not necessarily closed and so also not necessarily compact. For example, let $H$ be the separable Hilbert space $\ell^2(\N)$ of square-summable sequences with the usual norm $\|\cdot\|_2$ and let $e_n = (0, \ldots, 0, 1, 0, \ldots)$ be the standard orthonormal basis (that is $1$ at the $n^{\text{th}}$-coordinate). The closed set $S = \{0\} \cup \left\{\tfrac{1}{n} e_n\right\}$ is compact but its convex hull $\operatorname{co} S$ is not a closed set because $h := \sum_{n=1}^{\infty} \tfrac{1}{2^n} \tfrac{1}{n} e_n$ belongs to the closure of $\operatorname{co} S$ in $H$ but $h \not\in\operatorname{co} S$ (since every sequence $z \in \operatorname{co} S$ is a finite convex combination of elements of $S$ and so is necessarily $0$ in all but finitely many coordinates, which is not true of $h$). However, like in all complete Hausdorff locally convex spaces, the closed convex hull $K := \overline{\operatorname{co}} S$ of this compact subset is compact. The vector subspace $X := \operatorname{span} S$ is a pre-Hilbert space when endowed with the substructure that the Hilbert space $H$ induces on it but $X$ is not complete and $h \not\in K \cap X$ (since $h \not\in X$). The closed convex hull of $S$ in $X$ (here, "closed" means with respect to $X,$ and not to $H$ as before) is equal to $K \cap X,$ which is not compact (because it is not a complete subset). This shows that in a Hausdorff locally convex space that is not complete, the closed convex hull of compact subset might fail to be compact (although it will be precompact/totally bounded).

Every complete totally bounded set is relatively compact. If $X$ is any TVS then the quotient map $q : X \to X / \operatorname{cl}_X \{0\}$ is a closed map and thus $S + \operatorname{cl}_X \{0\} \subseteq \operatorname{cl}_X S$ A subset $S$ of a TVS $X$ is totally bounded if and only if its image under the canonical quotient map $q : X \to X / \operatorname{cl}_X \{0\}$ is totally bounded. Thus $S$ is totally bounded if and only if $S + \operatorname{cl}_X \{0\}$ is totally bounded. In any TVS, the closure of a totally bounded subset is again totally bounded. In a locally convex space, the convex hull and the disked hull of a totally bounded set is totally bounded. If $S$ is a subset of a TVS $X$ such that every sequence in $S$ has a cluster point in $S$ then $S$ is totally bounded. A subset $S$ of a Hausdorff TVS $X$ is totally bounded if and only if every ultrafilter on $S$ is Cauchy, which happens if and only if it is pre-compact (that is, its closure in the completion of $X$ is compact).

If $S \subseteq X$ is compact, then $\operatorname{cl}_X S = S + \operatorname{cl}_X \{0\}$ and this set is compact. Thus the closure of a compact set is compact (Note: In general topology, the closure of a compact subset of a non-Hausdorff space may fail to be compact (for example, the particular point topology on an infinite set). This result shows that this does not happen in non-Hausdorff TVSs. The proof uses the fact that $S$ is compact (but possibly not closed) and $\operatorname{cl}_X \{0\}$ is both closed and compact so that $S + \operatorname{cl}_X \{0\},$ which is the image of the compact set $S + \operatorname{cl}_X \{0\}$ under the continuous addition map $\cdot + \cdot : X \times X \to X,$ is also compact. Recall also that the sum of a compact set (that is, $S$) and a closed set is closed so $S + \operatorname{cl}_X \{0\}$ is closed in $X.$) (that is, all compact sets are relatively compact). Thus the closure of a compact set is compact. Every relatively compact subset of a Hausdorff TVS is totally bounded.

In a complete locally convex space, the convex hull and the disked hull of a compact set are both compact. More generally, if $K$ is a compact subset of a locally convex space, then the convex hull $\operatorname{co} K$ (resp. the disked hull $\operatorname{cobal} K$) is compact if and only if it is complete. Every subset $S$ of $\operatorname{cl}_X \{0\}$ is compact and thus complete. (Note: Given any open cover of $S,$ pick any open set $U$ from that cover that contains the origin. Since $U$ is a neighborhood of the origin, $U$ contains $\operatorname{cl}_X \{0\}$ and thus contains $S.$) In particular, if $X$ is not Hausdorff then there exist compact complete sets that are not closed.

== See also ==
- Complete metric space – Metric geometry
- Filter on a set – Family of subsets representing "large" sets
- Filters in topology – Use of filters to describe and characterize all basic topological notions and results
- Metrizable topological vector space – Topological vector space whose topology can be defined by a metric
- Pseudometric space – Generalization of metric spaces in mathematics
- Quasi-complete space – A topological vector space in which every closed and bounded subset is complete
- Sequentially complete
- Topological group – Group that is a topological space with continuous group action
- Uniform space – Topological space with a notion of uniform properties

== Notes ==
Proofs

== Bibliography ==
- Adasch, Norbert; Ernst, Bruno; Keim, Dieter (1978). Topological Vector Spaces: The Theory Without Convexity Conditions. Lecture Notes in Mathematics. Vol. 639. Berlin New York: Springer-Verlag. ISBN 978-3-540-08662-8. OCLC 297140003.
- Aliprantis, Charalambos D.; Border, Kim C. (2006). Infinite Dimensional Analysis: A Hitchhiker's Guide (Third ed.). Berlin: Springer Science & Business Media. ISBN 978-3-540-29587-7. OCLC 262692874.
- Arkhangel'skii, Alexander Vladimirovich; Ponomarev, V.I. (1984). Fundamentals of General Topology: Problems and Exercises. Mathematics and Its Applications. Vol. 13. Dordrecht Boston: D. Reidel. ISBN 978-90-277-1355-1. OCLC 9944489.
- Berberian, Sterling K. (1974). Lectures in Functional Analysis and Operator Theory. Graduate Texts in Mathematics. Vol. 15. New York: Springer. ISBN 978-0-387-90081-0. OCLC 878109401.
- Bogachev, Vladimir I; Smolyanov, Oleg G. (2017). Topological Vector Spaces and Their Applications. Springer Monographs in Mathematics. Cham, Switzerland: Springer International Publishing. ISBN 978-3-319-57117-1. OCLC 987790956.
- Bourbaki, Nicolas (1989) [1966]. General Topology: Chapters 1–4 [Topologie Générale]. Éléments de mathématique. Berlin New York: Springer Science & Business Media. ISBN 978-3-540-64241-1. OCLC 18588129.
- Bourbaki, Nicolas (1987) [1981]. Topological Vector Spaces: Chapters 1–5. Éléments de mathématique. Translated by Eggleston, H.G.; Madan, S. Berlin New York: Springer-Verlag. ISBN 3-540-13627-4. OCLC 17499190.
- Conway, John (1990). A course in functional analysis. Graduate Texts in Mathematics. Vol. 96 (2nd ed.). New York: Springer-Verlag. ISBN 978-0-387-97245-9. OCLC 21195908.
- Dixmier, Jacques (1984). General Topology. Undergraduate Texts in Mathematics. Translated by Berberian, S. K. New York: Springer-Verlag. ISBN 978-0-387-90972-1. OCLC 10277303.
- Dolecki, Szymon; Mynard, Frédéric (2016). Convergence Foundations Of Topology. New Jersey: World Scientific Publishing Company. ISBN 978-981-4571-52-4. OCLC 945169917.
- Dugundji, James (1966). Topology. Boston: Allyn and Bacon. ISBN 978-0-697-06889-7. OCLC 395340485.
- Dunford, Nelson; Schwartz, Jacob T. (1988). Linear Operators. Pure and applied mathematics. Vol. 1. New York: Wiley-Interscience. ISBN 978-0-471-60848-6. OCLC 18412261.
- Edwards, Robert E. (1995). Functional Analysis: Theory and Applications. New York: Dover Publications. ISBN 978-0-486-68143-6. OCLC 30593138.
- Grothendieck, Alexander (1973). Topological Vector Spaces. Translated by Chaljub, Orlando. New York: Gordon and Breach Science Publishers. ISBN 978-0-677-30020-7. OCLC 886098.
- Horváth, John (1966). Topological Vector Spaces and Distributions. Addison-Wesley series in mathematics. Vol. 1. Reading, MA: Addison-Wesley Publishing Company. ISBN 978-0201029857.
- Husain, Taqdir; Khaleelulla, S. M. (1978). Barrelledness in Topological and Ordered Vector Spaces. Lecture Notes in Mathematics. Vol. 692. Berlin, New York, Heidelberg: Springer-Verlag. ISBN 978-3-540-09096-0. OCLC 4493665.
- Jarchow, Hans (1981). Locally convex spaces. Stuttgart: B.G. Teubner. ISBN 978-3-519-02224-4. OCLC 8210342.
- Joshi, K. D. (1983). Introduction to General Topology. New York: John Wiley and Sons Ltd. ISBN 978-0-85226-444-7. OCLC 9218750.
- Khaleelulla, S. M. (1982). Counterexamples in Topological Vector Spaces. Lecture Notes in Mathematics. Vol. 936. Berlin, Heidelberg, New York: Springer-Verlag. ISBN 978-3-540-11565-6. OCLC 8588370.
- Köthe, Gottfried (1983) [1969]. Topological Vector Spaces I. Grundlehren der mathematischen Wissenschaften. Vol. 159. Translated by Garling, D.J.H. New York: Springer Science & Business Media. ISBN 978-3-642-64988-2. MR 0248498. OCLC 840293704.
- Köthe, Gottfried (1979). Topological Vector Spaces II. Grundlehren der mathematischen Wissenschaften. Vol. 237. New York: Springer Science & Business Media. ISBN 978-0-387-90400-9. OCLC 180577972.
- Megginson, Robert E. (1998), An introduction to Banach space theory, Graduate Texts in Mathematics, vol. 183, New York: Springer-Verlag, pp. xx+596, ISBN 0-387-98431-3
- Narici, Lawrence; Beckenstein, Edward (2011). Topological Vector Spaces. Pure and applied mathematics (Second ed.). Boca Raton, FL: CRC Press. ISBN 978-1584888666. OCLC 144216834.
- Osborne, Mason Scott (2013). Locally Convex Spaces. Graduate Texts in Mathematics. Vol. 269. Cham Heidelberg New York Dordrecht London: Springer Science & Business Media. ISBN 978-3-319-02045-7. OCLC 865578438.
- Robertson, Alex P.; Robertson, Wendy J. (1980). Topological Vector Spaces. Cambridge Tracts in Mathematics. Vol. 53. Cambridge England: Cambridge University Press. ISBN 978-0-521-29882-7. OCLC 589250.
- Schaefer, Helmut H.; Wolff, Manfred P. (1999). Topological Vector Spaces. GTM. Vol. 8 (Second ed.). New York, NY: Springer New York Imprint Springer. ISBN 978-1-4612-7155-0. OCLC 840278135.
- Schechter, Eric (1996). Handbook of Analysis and Its Foundations. San Diego, CA: Academic Press. ISBN 978-0-12-622760-4. OCLC 175294365.
- Schubert, Horst (1968). Topology. London: Macdonald & Co. ISBN 978-0-356-02077-8. OCLC 463753.
- Swartz, Charles (1992). An introduction to Functional Analysis. New York: M. Dekker. ISBN 978-0-8247-8643-4. OCLC 24909067.
- Trèves, François (2006) [1967]. Topological Vector Spaces, Distributions and Kernels. Mineola, N.Y.: Dover Publications. ISBN 978-0-486-45352-1. OCLC 853623322.
- Voigt, Jürgen (2020). A Course on Topological Vector Spaces. Compact Textbooks in Mathematics. Cham: Birkhäuser Basel. ISBN 978-3-030-32945-7. OCLC 1145563701.
- Wilansky, Albert (2013). Modern Methods in Topological Vector Spaces. Mineola, New York: Dover Publications, Inc. ISBN 978-0-486-49353-4. OCLC 849801114.
- Willard, Stephen (2004) [1970]. General Topology. Mineola, N.Y.: Dover Publications. ISBN 978-0-486-43479-7. OCLC 115240.
- Zălinescu, Constantin (30 July 2002). Convex Analysis in General Vector Spaces. River Edge, N.J. London: World Scientific Publishing. ISBN 978-981-4488-15-0. MR 1921556. OCLC 285163112 – via Internet Archive.
