= Dunford (surname) =

Dunford is a surname. Notable people with the surname include:

- Abby Dunford (born 2006), Canadian-American swimmer
- Christine Dunford (born 20th century), American actress
- Clint Dunford (1943–2021), Canadian politician
- Colin Dunford (born 1994), Irish hurler
- David Dunford (born 1988), Kenyan swimmer
- Jake Dunford (born 1994), Jersey cricketer
- Jason Dunford (born 1986), Kenyan swimmer, media personality etc.
- Jesse Dunford Wood (born 20th century), English chef and restaurateur
- Jim Dunford (1930–1982), Australian trade unionist and politician
- Jonathan Dunford (born 1959), American violist, father of Thomas
- Joseph Dunford (born 1955), US Marine Corps general
- Malcolm Dunford (born 1963), New Zealand association football player
- Matt Dunford (born 1968), Australian rugby league footballer
- Michael Dunford (football executive) (born 1953), English football administrator
- Michael Dunford (musician)
- Moe Dunford (born 1987), Irish actor
- Nelson Dunford (1906–1986), American mathematician
- Noel Dunford (born 1939), Canadian football player
- Thomas Dunford (born 1988), French lutenist, son of Jonathan
- Warren Dunford (born 1963), Canadian writer

== See also ==
- Dunford–Pettis property (Nelson Dunford)
- Dunford–Schwartz theorem (Nelson Dunford)
