= William G. Bade =

American mathematician (1924–2012)

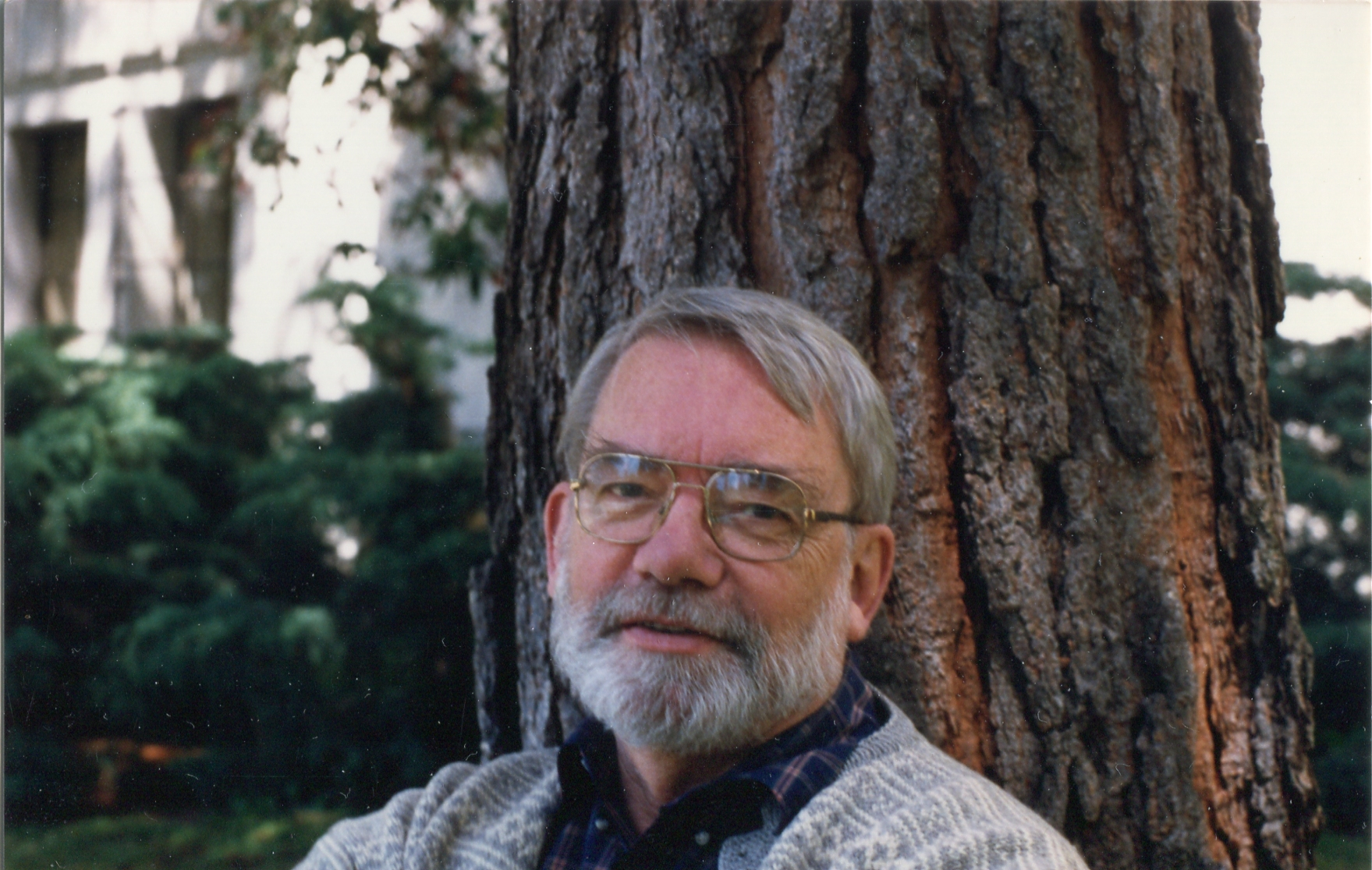
William G. Bade in 1988

William George Bade (29 May 1924, Oakland, California – 10 August 2012, Oakland, California) was an American mathematician, who did his most significant work on Banach algebras.

== Biography ==
Bade's father was scholar William F. Badè, who died in 1936. After his father's death, Bade moved with his mother and sister from Berkeley to San Diego, where he graduated from high school in 1942. He spent his freshman year in college at Pomona College and then, under the V-12 Navy College Training Program, studied at Caltech, where he received his bachelor's physics degree in 1945. He received more training which continued until after the end of WW II. After active duty as a Disbursing Officer in the U.S. Navy on the atoll of Truk, he was released from active duty in 1947 but was in the U. S. Naval Reserve until 1955. Bade earned a mathematics PhD in 1951 at UCLA under Angus Ellis Taylor with thesis An Operational Calculus for Operators with Spectrum Confined to a Strip. In the fall of 1951 Bade started teaching at UC Berkeley.

Bade's research started out in operator theory, but he soon moved into Banach algebras where he made fundamental contributions to the field of automatic continuity. In particular, his joint work with Philip C. Curtis, Jr., on the structure of homomorphisms from commutative C*-algebras into Banach algebras and Wedderburn decompositions of Banach algebras had a major impact on the development of Banach algebra theory. He remained active as a researcher well into his mid-70s, and his last paper - on Wedderburn decompositions - appeared in 2000.

On 2 July 1952 he married Eleanor "Elly" Jane Barry (1927–2024) and they moved to Connecticut where he worked at Yale University until 1955. Bade and Robert Bartle were research assistants from 1952 to 1954 working on Part I of Linear Operators by Nelson Dunford and Jacob T. Schwartz. In the fall of 1955 William and Eleanor Bade, with two children, returned to Berkeley, where William Bade had an appointment as an assistant professor in the UC Berkeley mathematics department. At Berkeley he became associate professor in 1959, full professor in 1964, and retired in 1991 as professor emeritus.

Bade supervised 24 doctoral dissertations. He was elected a Fellow of the American Mathematical Society in 2012, the year in which he died. Upon his death, he was survived by his wife, six children, and seven grandchildren.

== Selected works ==
=== Books ===
- with H. G. Dales and K. B. Laursen: Multipliers of radical Banach algebras of power series. American Mathematical Society. 1984. ISBN 9780821860434.
- with H. G. Dales and Z. A. Lykova: Algebraic and strong splittings of extensions of Banach algebras. American Mathematical Society. 1999. ISBN 9780821863794.

=== Articles ===
- Bade, William (1953). "An operational calculus for operators with spectrum in a strip". Pacific J. Math. 3 (2): 257–290. doi:10.2140/pjm.1953.3.257.
- Bade, William G. (1955). "On Boolean algebras of projections and algebras of operators". Trans. Amer. Math. Soc. 80 (2): 345–360. doi:10.1090/s0002-9947-1955-0073954-0. MR 0073954.
- Bade, William G. (1959). "A multiplicity theory for Boolean algebras of projections in Banach spaces". Trans. Amer. Math. Soc. 92 (3): 508–530. doi:10.1090/s0002-9947-1959-0108729-0. MR 0108729.
- with P. C. Curtis: Bade, W. G.; Curtis, P. C. (1960). "Homomorphisms of commutative Banach algebras". Amer. J. Math. 82 (3): 589–608. doi:10.2307/2372972. JSTOR 2372972.
- with P. C. Curtis: Bade, William; Curtis, Philip (1966). "Embedding theorems for commutative Banach algebras". Pacific J. Math. 18 (3): 391–409. doi:10.2140/pjm.1966.18.391.
- with P. C. Curtis and H. G. Dales: Bade, W. G.; Curtis, P. C.; Dales, H. G. (1987). "Amenability and weak amenability for Beurling and Lipschitz algebras". Proc. London Math. Soc. 3 (2): 359–377. doi:10.1093/plms/s3-55_2.359.
- with H. G. Dales: Dales, H.; Bade, W. (1989). "Continuity of derivations from radical convolution algebras". Studia Math. 95 (1): 59–91. doi:10.4064/sm-95-1-59-91.
