= Topological homomorphism =

Concept in functional analysis

In functional analysis, a topological homomorphism or simply homomorphism (if no confusion will arise) is the analog of homomorphisms for the category of topological vector spaces (TVSs). This concept is of considerable importance in functional analysis and the famous open mapping theorem gives a sufficient condition for a continuous linear map between Fréchet spaces to be a topological homomorphism.

== Definitions ==
A topological homomorphism or simply homomorphism (if no confusion will arise) is a continuous linear map $u : X \to Y$ between topological vector spaces (TVSs) such that the induced map $u : X \to \operatorname{Im} u$ is an open mapping when $\operatorname{Im} u := u(X),$ which is the image of $u,$ is given the subspace topology induced by $Y.$ This concept is of considerable importance in functional analysis and the famous open mapping theorem gives a sufficient condition for a continuous linear map between Fréchet spaces to be a topological homomorphism.

A TVS embedding or a topological monomorphism is an injective topological homomorphism. Equivalently, a TVS-embedding is a linear map that is also a topological embedding.

== Characterizations ==
Suppose that $u : X \to Y$ is a linear map between TVSs and note that $u$ can be decomposed into the composition of the following canonical linear maps:

$$X ~\overset{\pi}{\rightarrow}~ X / \operatorname{ker} u ~\overset{u_0}{\rightarrow}~ \operatorname{Im} u ~\overset{\operatorname{In}}{\rightarrow}~ Y$$

where $\pi : X \to X / \operatorname{ker} u$ is the canonical quotient map and $\operatorname{In} : \operatorname{Im} u \to Y$ is the inclusion map.

The following are equivalent:

1. $u$ is a topological homomorphism
2. for every neighborhood base $\mathcal{U}$ of the origin in $X,$ $u\left( \mathcal{U} \right)$ is a neighborhood base of the origin in $Y$
3. the induced map $u_0 : X / \operatorname{ker} u \to \operatorname{Im} u$ is an isomorphism of TVSs

If in addition the range of $u$ is a finite-dimensional Hausdorff space then the following are equivalent:

1. $u$ is a topological homomorphism
2. $u$ is continuous
3. $u$ is continuous at the origin
4. $u^{-1}(0)$ is closed in $X$

== Sufficient conditions ==
Theorem—Let $u : X \to Y$ be a surjective continuous linear map from an LF-space $X$ into a TVS $Y.$ If $Y$ is also an LF-space or if $Y$ is a Fréchet space then $u : X \to Y$ is a topological homomorphism.

Theorem—Suppose $f : X \to Y$ be a continuous linear operator between two Hausdorff TVSs. If $M$ is a dense vector subspace of $X$ and if the restriction $f\big\vert_M : M \to Y$ to $M$ is a topological homomorphism then $f : X \to Y$ is also a topological homomorphism.

So if $C$ and $D$ are Hausdorff completions of $X$ and $Y,$ respectively, and if $f : X \to Y$ is a topological homomorphism, then $f$'s unique continuous linear extension $F : C \to D$ is a topological homomorphism. (However, it is possible for $f : X \to Y$ to be surjective but for $F : C \to D$ to not be injective.)

=== Open mapping theorem ===
The open mapping theorem, also known as Banach's homomorphism theorem, gives a sufficient condition for a continuous linear operator between complete metrizable TVSs to be a topological homomorphism.

Theorem—Let $u : X \to Y$ be a continuous linear map between two complete metrizable TVSs. If $\operatorname{Im} u,$ which is the range of $u,$ is a dense subset of $Y$ then either $\operatorname{Im} u$ is meager (that is, of the first category) in $Y$ or else $u : X \to Y$ is a surjective topological homomorphism. In particular, $u : X \to Y$ is a topological homomorphism if and only if $\operatorname{Im} u$ is a closed subset of $Y.$

Corollary—Let $\sigma$ and $\tau$ be TVS topologies on a vector space $X$ such that each topology makes $X$ into a complete metrizable TVSs. If either $\sigma \subseteq \tau$ or $\tau \subseteq \sigma$ then $\sigma = \tau.$

Corollary—If $X$ is a complete metrizable TVS, $M$ and $N$ are two closed vector subspaces of $X,$ and if $X$ is the algebraic direct sum of $M$ and $N$ (i.e. the direct sum in the category of vector spaces), then $X$ is the direct sum of $M$ and $N$ in the category of topological vector spaces.

== Examples ==
Every continuous linear functional on a TVS is a topological homomorphism.

Let $X$ be a $1$-dimensional TVS over the field $\mathbb{K}$ and let $x \in X$ be non-zero. Let $L : \mathbb{K} \to X$ be defined by $L(s) := s x.$ If $\mathbb{K}$ has it usual Euclidean topology and if $X$ is Hausdorff then $L : \mathbb{K} \to X$ is a TVS-isomorphism.

== See also ==
- Homomorphism – Structure-preserving map between two algebraic structures of the same type
- Open mapping – A function that sends open (resp. closed) subsets to open (resp. closed) subsets
- Surjection of Fréchet spaces – Characterization of surjectivity
- Topological vector space – Vector space with a notion of nearness

== Bibliography ==
- Bourbaki, Nicolas (1987) [1981]. Topological Vector Spaces: Chapters 1–5. Éléments de mathématique. Translated by Eggleston, H.G.; Madan, S. Berlin New York: Springer-Verlag. ISBN 3-540-13627-4. OCLC 17499190.
- Jarchow, Hans (1981). Locally convex spaces. Stuttgart: B.G. Teubner. ISBN 978-3-519-02224-4. OCLC 8210342.
- Köthe, Gottfried (1983) [1969]. Topological Vector Spaces I. Grundlehren der mathematischen Wissenschaften. Vol. 159. Translated by Garling, D.J.H. New York: Springer Science & Business Media. ISBN 978-3-642-64988-2. MR 0248498. OCLC 840293704.
- Köthe, Gottfried (1979). Topological Vector Spaces II. Grundlehren der mathematischen Wissenschaften. Vol. 237. New York: Springer Science & Business Media. ISBN 978-0-387-90400-9. OCLC 180577972.
- Narici, Lawrence; Beckenstein, Edward (2011). Topological Vector Spaces. Pure and applied mathematics (Second ed.). Boca Raton, FL: CRC Press. ISBN 978-1584888666. OCLC 144216834.
- Robertson, Alex P.; Robertson, Wendy J. (1980). Topological Vector Spaces. Cambridge Tracts in Mathematics. Vol. 53. Cambridge England: Cambridge University Press. ISBN 978-0-521-29882-7. OCLC 589250.
- Schaefer, Helmut H.; Wolff, Manfred P. (1999). Topological Vector Spaces. GTM. Vol. 8 (Second ed.). New York, NY: Springer New York Imprint Springer. ISBN 978-1-4612-7155-0. OCLC 840278135.
- Schaefer, Helmut H.; Wolff, Manfred P. (1999). Topological Vector Spaces. GTM. Vol. 8 (Second ed.). New York, NY: Springer New York Imprint Springer. ISBN 978-1-4612-7155-0. OCLC 840278135.
- Schechter, Eric (1996). Handbook of Analysis and Its Foundations. San Diego, CA: Academic Press. ISBN 978-0-12-622760-4. OCLC 175294365.
- Swartz, Charles (1992). An introduction to Functional Analysis. New York: M. Dekker. ISBN 978-0-8247-8643-4. OCLC 24909067.
- Swartz, Charles (1992). An introduction to Functional Analysis. New York: M. Dekker. ISBN 978-0-8247-8643-4. OCLC 24909067.
- Trèves, François (2006) [1967]. Topological Vector Spaces, Distributions and Kernels. Mineola, N.Y.: Dover Publications. ISBN 978-0-486-45352-1. OCLC 853623322.
- Valdivia, Manuel (1982). Nachbin, Leopoldo (ed.). Topics in Locally Convex Spaces. Vol. 67. Amsterdam New York, N.Y.: Elsevier Science Pub. Co. ISBN 978-0-08-087178-3. OCLC 316568534.
- Voigt, Jürgen (2020). A Course on Topological Vector Spaces. Compact Textbooks in Mathematics. Cham: Birkhäuser Basel. ISBN 978-3-030-32945-7. OCLC 1145563701.
- Wilansky, Albert (2013). Modern Methods in Topological Vector Spaces. Mineola, New York: Dover Publications, Inc. ISBN 978-0-486-49353-4. OCLC 849801114.
