= Dorothy Lewis Bernstein =

American mathematician (1914–1988)

- Dorothy Lewis Bernstein
- Born: April 11, 1914; Chicago, Illinois, U.S.
- Died: February 5, 1988 (aged 73); Providence, Rhode Island, U.S.
- Education: University of Wisconsin; Brown University
- Scientific career
- Fields: Applied mathematics
- Workplaces: Mount Holyoke College; University of Wisconsin; University of Rochester; Goucher College
- Doctoral advisor: Jacob Tamarkin

Dorothy Lewis Bernstein (April 11, 1914 – February 5, 1988) was an American mathematician known for her work in applied mathematics, statistics, computer programming, and her research on the Laplace transform. She was the first woman to be elected president of the Mathematics Association of America.

== Early life ==
Bernstein was born in Chicago, the daughter of Russian Jewish immigrants Jacob Louis Bernstein (1880–1956) and Tille (Lewis, originally Loyev; 1887–1969). Her parents had little or no formal education but encouraged their five children to seek education; all five earned either a PhD or MD.

== Education ==
Bernstein attended North Division High School (Milwaukee, Wisconsin). In 1930, she attended the University of Wisconsin, where she held a University Scholarship (1933–1934) and was elected to Phi Beta Kappa. In 1934, she graduated with both a B.A degree, summa cum laude, and a M.A. Degree in Mathematics. She did her master's thesis research on finding complex roots of polynomials by an extension of Newton's method. In 1935, she attended Brown University, where she became a member of the scientific society Sigma Xi. She earned her Ph.D. in mathematics from Brown in 1939, while simultaneously holding a teaching position at Mount Holyoke College. Her dissertation was entitled "The Double Laplace Integral" and was published in the Duke Mathematical Journal.

== Career ==
From 1943 to 1959, she taught at the University of Rochester, where she worked on existence theorems for partial differential equations. Her work was motivated by non-linear problems that were just being tackled by high-speed digital computers. In 1950, Princeton University Press published her book, Existence Theorems in Partial Differential Equations. She spent 1959–1979 as a professor of mathematics at Goucher College, where she was chair of the mathematics department for most of that time (1960–1970, 1974–1979).

She professed that she was particularly interested combining pure and applied mathematics in the undergraduate curriculum. Due in great part to Bernstein's ability to get grants from the National Science Foundation, Goucher College was the first women's university to use computers in mathematics instruction, beginning in 1961. She developed an internship program for Goucher mathematics students to obtain meaningful employment experience.

In 1972, she cofounded the Maryland Association for Educational Uses of Computers, and was interested in incorporating computers into secondary school mathematics. Bernstein was very active in the Mathematical Association of America, where she was on the board of governors from 1965 to 1968. She served as the vice president in 1972–1973, and later became the first female president of the MAA in 1979–1980.

== Women in mathematics ==
She noted that attitudes and opportunities for women changed drastically after World War II, which she attributed to two causes. First, that women demonstrated they could handle the jobs formerly held by men, and second that the rise of computer technology opened up many new areas of mathematical applications resulting in new jobs.

== Death ==
Bernstein was treated for her final illness in Rhode Island Hospital, Providence, Rhode Island, where she died at the age of 73. She was buried in Anshai Lebowitz Cemetery, Milwaukee where her father and mother had been buried.

== Memberships ==
- Mathematical Association of America
- American Mathematical Society
- Society for Industrial and Applied Mathematics
- American Association of University Professors
- Fellow, American Association for the Advancement of Science, 1981

== Bibliography ==
- Fasanelli, F. D. (1987), "Dorothy Lewis Bernstein", in Grinstein, Louise S.; Campbell, Paul J. (eds.), Women of Mathematics: A Bio-Bibliographic Sourcebook, New York: Greenwood Press, pp. 17–20, ISBN 978-0-313-24849-8.
