= Jacob Tamarkin =

Russian-American mathematician (1888–1945)

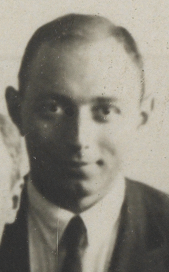
- At a Topological Congress in Moscow 1935
- Born: 11 July 1888; Chernigov, Russian Empire
- Died: 18 November 1945 (aged 57); Bethesda, Maryland, U.S.
- Citizenship: Russian-American
- Education: Saint Petersburg State University
- Scientific career
- Fields: Mathematics
- Workplaces: Brown University
- Doctoral advisor: Andrei Markov
- Doctoral students: Dorothy Bernstein; Nelson Dunford; George Forsythe; Margaret Gurney; Derrick Lehmer; Rose Sedgewick

Jacob David Tamarkin (Russian: Я́ков Дави́дович Тама́ркин, romanized: Yakov Davidovich Tamarkin, Ukrainian: Яків Давидович Тамаркін, romanized: Yakiv Davydovych Tamarkin; 11 July 1888 – 18 November 1945) was a Russian-American mathematician, best known for his work in mathematical analysis.

== Biography ==
Tamarkin was born in Chernigov, Russian Empire (now Chernihiv, Ukraine), to a wealthy Jewish family. His father, David Tamarkin, was a physician and his mother, Sophie Krassilschikov, was from a family of a landowner. He shares a common ancestor with the Van Leer family, sometimes spelled Von Löhr or Valar. He moved to St. Petersburg as a child and grew up there. In high school, he befriended Alexander Friedmann, a future cosmologist, with whom he wrote his first mathematics paper in 1906, and remained friends and colleagues until Friedmann's sudden death in 1925. Vladimir Smirnov was his other friend from the same gymnasium. Many years later, they coauthored a popular textbook titled "A course in higher mathematics".

Tamarkin studied in St. Petersburg University where he defended his dissertation in 1917. His advisor was Andrei Markov. After the graduation, Tamarkin worked at the Communication Institute and Electrotechnical Institute. In 1919 he temporarily became a professor and a dean at Perm State University, but a year later returned to St. Petersburg where he received a professorship at St. Petersburg Polytechnical University.

In 1925 he became worried about Russia's stability and decided to immigrate to the United States. His favorite memory was the examination in analytic geometry he had to take with an American consul in Riga, when he tried to prove his identity. In the U.S., he became a lecturer at Dartmouth College. In 1927, Tamarkin received a professorship at Brown University where he remained until his retirement in 1945, after suffering a heart attack. He died later that year in Bethesda, Maryland, a suburb of Washington, D.C.

Tamarkin's work spanned a number of areas, including number theory, integral equations, Fourier series, complex analysis, moment problem, boundary value problem and differential equations. He was a proponent and a founding co-editor of the Mathematical Reviews (which was based at Brown at that time), together with Otto Neugebauer and William Feller. He was also an active supporter of the American Mathematical Society, a member of the council starting 1931, and a vice-president in 1942–43. He had over twenty doctoral students at Brown, including Dorothy Lewis Bernstein, Nelson Dunford, George Forsythe, Margaret Gurney and Derrick Lehmer.

Tamarkin was married to Helene Weichardt (1888–1934) who came from a wealthy family of German ancestry. Their son, Paul Tamarkin (1922–1977), was a physicist for RAND Corporation.
