= Sequentially complete =

In mathematics, specifically in topology and functional analysis, a subspace S of a uniform space X is said to be sequentially complete or semi-complete if every Cauchy sequence in S converges to an element in S. X is called sequentially complete if it is a sequentially complete subset of itself.

== Sequentially complete topological vector spaces ==
Every topological vector space is a uniform space so the notion of sequential completeness can be applied to them.

=== Properties of sequentially complete topological vector spaces ===
1. A bounded sequentially complete disk in a Hausdorff topological vector space is a Banach disk.
2. A Hausdorff locally convex space that is sequentially complete and bornological is ultrabornological.

== Examples and sufficient conditions ==
1. Every complete space is sequentially complete but not conversely.
2. For metrizable spaces, sequential completeness implies completeness. Together with the previous property, this means sequential completeness and completeness are equivalent over metrizable spaces.
3. Every complete topological vector space is quasi-complete and every quasi-complete topological vector space is sequentially complete.

== See also ==
- Cauchy net
- Complete space
- Complete topological vector space
- Quasi-complete space
- Topological vector space
- Uniform space

== Bibliography ==
- Khaleelulla, S. M. (1982). Counterexamples in Topological Vector Spaces. Lecture Notes in Mathematics. Vol. 936. Berlin, Heidelberg, New York: Springer-Verlag. ISBN 978-3-540-11565-6. OCLC 8588370.
- Rudin, Walter (1991). Functional Analysis. International Series in Pure and Applied Mathematics. Vol. 8 (Second ed.). New York, NY: McGraw-Hill Science/Engineering/Math. ISBN 978-0-07-054236-5. OCLC 21163277.
- Narici, Lawrence; Beckenstein, Edward (2011). Topological Vector Spaces. Pure and applied mathematics (Second ed.). Boca Raton, FL: CRC Press. ISBN 978-1584888666. OCLC 144216834.
- Schaefer, Helmut H.; Wolff, Manfred P. (1999). Topological Vector Spaces. GTM. Vol. 8 (Second ed.). New York, NY: Springer New York Imprint Springer. ISBN 978-1-4612-7155-0. OCLC 840278135.
- Trèves, François (2006) [1967]. Topological Vector Spaces, Distributions and Kernels. Mineola, N.Y.: Dover Publications. ISBN 978-0-486-45352-1. OCLC 853623322.
