= Linear Operators (book) =

Textbook by Nelson Dunford and Jacob T. Schwartz

Linear Operators is a three-volume textbook on the theory of linear operators, written by Nelson Dunford and Jacob T. Schwartz. The three volumes are (I) General Theory; (II) Spectral Theory, Self Adjoint Operators in Hilbert Space; and (III) Spectral Operators. The first volume was published in 1958, the second in 1963, and the third in 1971. All three volumes were reprinted by Wiley in 1988. Canonically cited as Dunford and Schwartz, the textbook has been referred to as "the definitive work" on linear operators.

The work began as a written set of solutions to the problems for Dunford's graduate course in linear operators at Yale. Schwartz, a prodigy, had taken his undergraduate degree at Yale in 1948, age 18. In 1949 he began his graduate studies and enrolled in his course. Dunford recognised Schwartz's intelligence and they began a long collaboration, with Dunford acting as Schwartz's advisor for his dissertation Linear Elliptic Differential Operators. One fruit of their collaboration was the Dunford-Schwartz theorem. The work was originally intended to be a short introduction to functional analysis (the original material comprising what was published as Chapters 2, 4, 7 and part of 10 in Volume I) but the material ballooned. The work enjoyed funding from the Office of Naval Research and a popular joke at the time was that every nuclear submarine had a copy. William G. Bade and Robert G. Bartle were brought on as research assistants. Dunford retired shortly after finishing the final volume. Schwartz, however, went on to write similarly pathbreaking books in various other areas of mathematics. (Note: To give some impression of Schwartz's energies: in the three-year period between the publication of the second and third volumes of Linear Operators, Schwartz published a book on W*-algebras (1967), one on Lie algebras (1968), and one on nonlinear functional analysis (1969).)

The book met with acclaim when published. It won the Leroy P. Steele Prize in 1981, awarded by the American Mathematical Society. In the citation for this prize, the committee observed "This monumental work of 2,592 pages must be the most comprehensive of its kind in mathematics ... A whole generation of analysts has been trained from it." Peter Lax remarked that it "contained everything known, and many things not yet known, on linear functional analysis." Béla Szőkefalvi-Nagy wrote in a review of the first volume: "the authors have created an extraordinarily important and valuable work that is distinguished in particular by its monumental completeness, clear organization, and attractive exposition". Gian-Carlo Rota, who was involved in checking the exercises, wrote that "the contrast between the uncompromising abstraction of the text and the incredible variety of the concrete examples in the exercises is immensely beneficial to any student learning mathematical analysis."

Every chapter of the book ends with a section entitled "Notes and Remarks", giving historical background on the topic and informal discussion of related topics. The book contains more than a thousand exercises, wide-ranging and often difficult. One particularly difficult exercise was not solved until Dunford assigned it to a young Robert Langlands. (Note: The second volume contains a thanks to Langlands, noting that "R. Langlands has shown that Exercise III.9.20 [in volume one] is false and as a result has made a decided improvement on a result of Alexandroff (III.5.13)." Rota recalled that, when called attention to this exercise, nobody could recall how it had made its way into the book and neither Dunford nor Schwartz could not solve it. Dunford happened to assign it to Langlands when he took Dunford's course. According to Langlands' recollection, "One exercise in their collection had to be corrected, but it took some effort to convince Dunford of this and some time before he was willing to listen to my explanations and, I suppose, examine my counter-example.")
