= Margaret Gurney =

American mathematician

Margaret Gurney (October 28, 1908 – March 19, 2002) was an American mathematician, statistician, and computer programmer. Originally trained in the mathematical study of partial differential equations at Swarthmore College, Brown University, and the University of Göttingen, she came to work for the United States Census Bureau. There, she became known for her expertise in sampling, stratified sampling, and survey methodology. At the Census Bureau she also worked as an early programmer of the UNIVAC I computer. Later, she became an international consultant, teaching statistical methods in developing countries. She won the Department of Commerce Silver Medal and was recognized as a Fellow of the American Statistical Association.

== Early life and education ==
Gurney's parents, Anna Elizabeth Pickett and Dayton Alvin Gurney, both studied at Michigan State University, then called the State Agricultural College. Her father became a civilian engineer for the military (later the chief engineer of the Ordnance Department), and she and her two siblings were born in Washington, DC. She attended Central High School there, and then went to Swarthmore College with the support of a White scholarship. At Swarthmore, she completed a bachelor's degree in mathematics, physics, and astronomy in 1930, with highest honors.

She began graduate study at Brown University in 1930 and earned a master's degree there in 1931. From 1932 to 1933 she traveled on a fellowship to the University of Göttingen in Germany; she returned to Brown, and completed her Ph.D. there in 1934. Her dissertation, on the mathematical analysis of hyperbolic partial differential equations, was Some General Existence Theorems for Partial Differential Equations of Hyperbolic Type; her doctoral advisor was Jacob Tamarkin.

== Career ==
Gurney began her work with the US Government in 1938, working for the Budget Bureau first as a statistical consultant and then beginning in 1940 as an economist. She moved to the United States Census Bureau in 1944, and retired from the census in 1973. At the Census Bureau, Gurney helped plan sampling-based surveys, and implemented her statistical methods on the UNIVAC I, the first commercial computer in the United States.

Beginning in 1961, and continuing past her retirement, Gurney also worked as an international statistical consultant, teaching statistical methodology and agricultural statistics in developing parts of the world in association with the Bureau of Labor Statistics of the United States Department of Labor. She began this work in Puerto Rico and later continued this work in Central and South America, Africa, and Southeast Asia.

She lived with her sister Ruth Park in Quilcene, Washington after her retirement and died there on March 19, 2002.

== Recognition ==
Gurney was awarded the Department of Commerce Silver Medal in 1966, "for her continuous contributions to the theory and application of sample survey methods over a long period". In 1968, Gurney was elected as a Fellow of the American Statistical Association in honor of her "distinguished contributions to the theory of recurrent sample surveys, to the measurement of nonsampling errors, and to training programs of foreign statisticians in sample surveys of their own countries".

== Selected publications ==
- Gurney, Margaret (December 1932), "Cesàro summability of double series", Bulletin of the American Mathematical Society, 38 (12): 825–827, doi:10.1090/S0002-9904-1932-05528-8, MR 1562525
- Hansen, Morris H.; Hurwitz, William N.; Gurney, Margaret (June 1946), "Problems and methods of the sample survey of business", Journal of the American Statistical Association, 41 (234): 173–189, doi:10.1080/01621459.1946.10501862
- Dalenius, Tore; Gurney, Margaret (January 1951), "The problem of optimum stratification. II", Scandinavian Actuarial Journal, 1951 (1–2): 133–148, doi:10.1080/03461238.1951.10432134, MR 0048752
- Gurney, Margaret; Daly, Joseph F. (1965), "A multivariate approach to estimation in periodic sample surveys", Proceedings of the Social Statistics Section, American Statistical Association, pp. 242–257
- Gurney, Margaret; Jewett, Robert S. (December 1975), "Constructing orthogonal replications for variance estimation", Journal of the American Statistical Association, 70 (352): 819–821, doi:10.1080/01621459.1975.10480308
