= Rose Whelan Sedgewick =

American mathematician

- Born: Rose Alice Whelan; Brockton, MA, USA
- Died: 7 June 2000 (aged 96); Dunedin, FL, USA
- Education: Brown University
- Scientific career
- Fields: Mathematics
- Workplaces: University of Rochester; University of Connecticut; Hillyer College; University of Maryland
- Doctoral advisor: Jacob David Tamarkin

Rose Whelan Sedgewick (c. 1904 – 2000) was an American mathematician. She was the first person to earn a PhD in mathematics from Brown University, in 1929. Her subsequent career in mathematics included assistant professorships at the University of Rochester, the University of Connecticut, Hillyer College, and the University of Maryland.

Sedgewick is the namesake of the Rose Whelan Society at Brown, an organization for women and gender minorities who are graduate students, post-doctoral fellows and faculty in pure and applied in mathematics. She was married to fellow mathematician Charles H.W. Sedgewick and had four children. She died on June 7, 2000, at the age of 96.

== Professional honors ==
- Mathematical Association of America
- American Mathematical Society
- Phi Beta Kappa
- Sigma Xi
