= Dunford–Pettis property =

In functional analysis, the Dunford–Pettis property, named after Nelson Dunford and B. J. Pettis, is a property of a Banach space stating that all weakly compact operators from this space into another Banach space are completely continuous. Many standard Banach spaces have this property, most notably, the space $C(K)$ of continuous functions on a compact space and the space $L^1(\mu)$ of the Lebesgue integrable functions on a measure space. Alexander Grothendieck introduced the concept in the early 1950s (Grothendieck 1953), following the work of Dunford and Pettis, who developed earlier results of Shizuo Kakutani, Kōsaku Yosida, and several others. Important results were obtained more recently by Jean Bourgain. Nevertheless, the Dunford–Pettis property is not completely understood.

== Definition ==
A Banach space $X$ has the Dunford–Pettis property if every continuous weakly compact operator $T : X \to Y$ from $X$ into another Banach space $Y$ transforms weakly compact sets in $X$ into norm-compact sets in $Y$ (such operators are called completely continuous). An important equivalent definition is that for any weakly convergent sequences $x_1, x_2, \ldots$ of $X$ and $f_1, f_2, \ldots$ of the dual space $X^*,$ converging (weakly) to $x$ and $f,$ the sequence $f_1(x_1), f_2(x_2), \ldots, f_n(x_n), \ldots$ converges to $f(x).$

== Counterexamples ==
- The second definition may appear counterintuitive at first, but consider an orthonormal basis $e_n$ of an infinite-dimensional, separable Hilbert space $H.$ Then $e_n \to 0$ weakly, but for all $n$
  $$\langle e_n, e_n\rangle = 1.$$
  Thus separable infinite-dimensional Hilbert spaces cannot have the Dunford–Pettis property.
- Consider as another example the space $L^p(-\pi, \pi)$ where $1 < p < \infty.$ The sequences $x_n = e^{inx}$ in $L^p$ and $f_n = e^{inx}$ in $L^q = \left(L^p\right)^*$ both converge weakly to zero. But
  $$\langle f_n, x_n \rangle = \int\limits_{-\pi}^\pi 1\, {\rm d}x = 2 \pi.$$
- More generally, no infinite-dimensional reflexive Banach space may have the Dunford–Pettis property. In particular, an infinite-dimensional Hilbert space and more generally, Lp spaces with $1 < p < \infty$ do not possess this property.

== Examples ==
- If $K$ is a compact Hausdorff space, then the Banach space $C(K)$ of continuous functions with the uniform norm has the Dunford–Pettis property.

== See also ==
- Grothendieck space
