= Noel Dunford =

Canadian football player

Profile
- Position: End

Personal information
- Born: December 24, 1939 (age 86); Kenora, Ontario
- Listed height: 6 ft 2 in (1.88 m)
- Listed weight: 185 lb (84 kg)

Career history
- 1963–1968: Winnipeg Blue Bombers

Noel Dunford (born December 24, 1939) was a Canadian professional football player who played for the Winnipeg Blue Bombers. He previously played for the St. James Rams (Intermediate).
