= Éléments de mathématique =

Series of mathematics books by Nicolas Bourbaki

Éléments de mathématique (Elements of Mathematics)
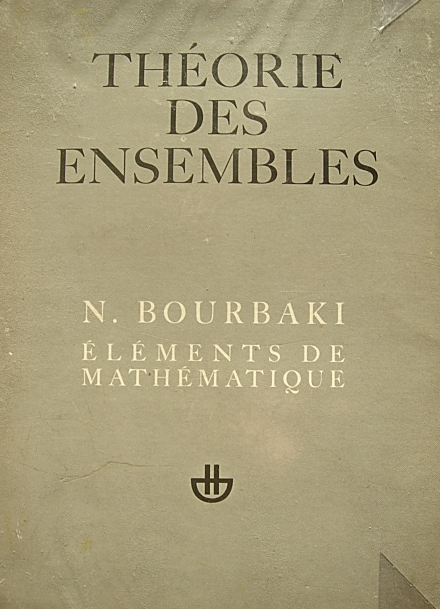
- 1970 edition of Théorie des ensembles (Theory of Sets), first volume of the series
- Author: Nicolas Bourbaki
- Original title: Traité d'analyse (Treatise on Analysis)
- Country: France
- Language: French, English
- Discipline: Mathematics
- Publisher: Hermann (historical), Masson (historical), Springer (current)
- Published: 1939-present
- No. of books: 29 (French), 15 (English)
- Website: www.bourbaki.fr/Ouvrages.html

Éléments de mathématique (English: Elements of Mathematic) is a series of mathematics books written by the pseudonymous French collective Nicolas Bourbaki. Begun in 1939, the series has been published in several volumes, and remains in progress. The series is noted as a large-scale, self-contained, formal treatment of mathematics.

The members of the Bourbaki group originally intended the work as a textbook on analysis, with the working title Traité d'analyse (Treatise on Analysis). While planning the structure of the work they became more ambitious, expanding its scope to cover several branches of modern mathematics. Once the plan of the work was expanded to treat other fields in depth, the title Éléments de mathématique was adopted. Topics treated in the series include set theory, abstract algebra, topology, analysis, Lie groups and Lie algebras.

The unusual singular "mathématique" (mathematic) of the title is deliberate, meant to convey the authors' belief in the unity of mathematics. A companion volume, Éléments d'histoire des mathématiques (Elements of the History of Mathematics), collects and reproduces several of the historical notes that previously appeared in the work.

== History ==
In late 1934, a group of mathematicians including André Weil resolved to collectively write a textbook on mathematical analysis. They intended their work as a modern replacement for Édouard Goursat's Course in Mathematical Analysis (1902) —and also to fill a void in instructional material caused by the death of a generation of mathematics students in World War I. The group adopted the collective pseudonym Nicolas Bourbaki, after the French general Charles-Denis Bourbaki. During the late 1930s and early 1940s, the Bourbaki group expanded the plan of their work beyond analysis, and began publishing texts under the title Éléments de mathématique.

Volumes of the Éléments have appeared periodically since the publication of the first Fascicule ("Installment") in 1939 by Éditions Hermann, with several being published during the 1950s and 1960s, Bourbaki's most productive period and time of greatest influence. Several years have sometimes passed before the publication of a new volume, and various factors have contributed to a slow pace of publication. The group's working style is slow and rigorous, and a final product is not deemed acceptable unless it is unanimously approved by the group. Further, World War II interrupted Bourbaki's activities during its early years. In the 1970s a legal dispute arose with Hermann, the group's original publisher, concerning copyright and royalty payments. The Bourbaki group won the involved lawsuit, retaining copyright over the work authored under the pseudonym, but at a price: the legal battle had dominated the group's attention during the 1970s, preventing them from doing productive mathematical work under the Bourbaki name. Following the lawsuit and during the 1980s, publication of new volumes was resumed via Éditions Masson. From the 1980s through the 2000s Bourbaki published very infrequently, with the result that in 1998 Le Monde pronounced the collective "dead". However, in 2012 Bourbaki resumed publication of the Éléments with a revised and expanded edition of the eighth chapter of Algebra, followed by the first of new books on algebraic topology (covering also material that had originally been planned as the eleventh chapter of the group's book on general topology), a significantly expanded book on spectral theory in two volumes, and in 2026 two new chapter on topological vector spaces. Furthermore, two entirely new books (on category theory and modular forms) are stated to be under preparation.

Springer Verlag became Bourbaki's current publisher during the 21st century, reprinting the Éléments while also publishing new volumes. Some early versions of the Éléments can be viewed at an online archive, and the mathematical historian Liliane Beaulieu has documented the sequence of publication.

The Éléments have had a complex publication history. From the 1940s through the 1960s, Bourbaki published the Éléments in booklet form as small installments of individual chapters, known in the French as fascicules. Despite having settled on a logical sequence for the work (see below), Bourbaki did not publish the Éléments in the order of its logical structure. Rather, the group planned the arc of the work in broad strokes and published disparate chapters wherever they could agree on a final product, with the understanding that (logically) later chapters published (chronologically) first would ultimately have to be grounded in the later publication of logically earlier chapters. The first installment of the Éléments to be published was the Summary of Results for the Theory of Sets in 1939; the first proper chapter of content on set theory—with proofs and theorems—did not appear until 1954. Independently of the work's logical structure, the early fascicules were assigned chronological numberings by the publisher Hermann for historical reference. Gradually, the small fascicules were collected and reprinted in larger volumes, forming the basis of the modern edition of the work.

The large majority of the Éléments has been translated into an English edition, although this translation is incomplete. Currently the complete French edition of the work consists of 12 books printed in 29 volumes, with 73 chapters. The English edition completely reproduces seven books and partially reproduces two, with three unavailable; it comprises 14 volumes, reproducing 58 of the original's 73 chapters. (Note: In both cases, the counts of each edition's books and volumes include the historical compilation Elements of the History of Mathematics. However, the chapter count refers to the chapters of mathematical content in the Éléments proper, excluding sections (or chapters) of historical notes reproduced in Elements of the History of Mathematics.) However, the English General Topology is not based on latest revised French edition (of 1971 and 1974) and misses some material added there (for example on quaternions and rotation groups in Chapter VIII).

== Structure ==
Éléments de mathématique is divided into books, volumes, and chapters. A book refers to a broad area of investigation or branch of mathematics (Algebra, Integration); a given book is sometimes published in multiple volumes (physical books) or else in a single volume. The work is further subdivided into chapters with some volumes consisting of a single chapter.

Typically of mathematics textbooks, the Éléments' chapters present definitions, mathematical notation, proofs of theorems and exercises, forming the core mathematical content of the work. The chapters are supplemented by historical notes and summaries of results. The former usually appear after a given chapter to contextualize the development of its topics, and the latter are occasionally used sections in which a book's major results are collected and stated without proof. Eléments d'histoire des mathématiques is a compilation volume of several of the historical note sections previously published in the Éléments proper, through the book on Lie groups and Lie algebras.

When Bourbaki's founders originally planned the Treatise on Analysis, they conceived of an introductory and foundational section of the text, which would describe all prerequisite concepts from scratch. This proposed area of the text was referred to as the "Abstract Packet" (Paquet Abstrait). During the early planning stages the founders greatly expanded the scope of the abstract packet, with the result that it would require several volumes for its expression rather than a section or chapter in a single volume. This portion of the Éléments was gradually realized as its first three books, dealing with set theory, abstract algebra, and general topology.

Today, the Éléments divide into two parts. Bourbaki structured the first part of the work into six sequentially numbered books: I. Theory of Sets, II. Algebra, III. General Topology, IV. Functions of a Real Variable, V. Topological Vector Spaces, and VI. Integration. The first six books are given the unifying subtitle Les structures fondamentales de l’analyse (Fundamental Structures of Analysis), fulfilling Bourbaki's original intent to write a rigorous treatise on analysis, together with a thorough presentation of set theory, algebra and general topology.

Throughout the Fundamental Structures of Analysis, any statements or proofs presented within a given chapter assume as given the results established in previous chapters, or previously in the same chapter. In detail, the logical structure within the first six books is as follows, with each section taking as given all preceding material:

- I: Theory of Sets
- II (1): Algebra, chapters 1-3
- III (1): General Topology, chapters 1-3
- II (2): Algebra, from chapter 4 onwards
- III (2): General topology, from chapter 4 onwards
- IV: Functions of a Real Variable
- V: Topological Vector Spaces
- VI: Integration (Note: This precise logical structure is indicated in the "To the Reader" front matter in a minority of the English volumes. See pp. v-vi in any of the five following volumes: Algebra II, Functions of a Real Variable, Topological Vector Spaces, Integration I, and Integration II. See the below table for detailed bibliographical information for each volume.)

Thus the six books are also "logically ordered", with the caveat that some material presented in the later chapters of Algebra, the second book, invokes results from the early chapters of General Topology, the third book. (Note: One example of this "reverse order" among the early, foundational chapters of the Éléments is the following. In the fourth chapter of Algebra, an object denoted $A[[I]]$ is described in terms of its algebraic properties, and a definition given in the third chapter of (the later book) General Topology is cited to establish that the object $A[[I]]$ is also a topological ring.)

Following the Fundamental Structures of Analysis, the second part of the Éléments consists of books treating more modern research topics: Lie Groups and Lie Algebras, Commutative Algebra, Spectral Theory, Differential and Analytic Manifolds, and Algebraic Topology. Whereas the Éléments' first six books followed a strict, sequential logical structure, each book in the second part is dependent on the results established in the first six books, but not on those of the second part's other books. The second part of the work also lacks a unifying subtitle comparable to the Fundamental Structures of Analysis.

== Volumes ==
The Éléments are published in French and English volumes, detailed below.

Volumes of the Éléments de mathématique
French edition				English edition			
Book	Volume	Ch. no.	Chapter	Book	Volume	Ch. no.	Chapter
Théorie des ensembles	Théorie des ensembles	1	Description de la mathématique formelle	Theory of Sets	Theory of Sets	1	Description of Formal Mathematics
Théorie des ensembles	Théorie des ensembles	2	Théorie des ensembles	Theory of Sets	Theory of Sets	2	Theory of Sets
Théorie des ensembles	Théorie des ensembles	3	Ensembles ordonnés, cardinaux, nombres entiers	Theory of Sets	Theory of Sets	3	Ordered Sets, Cardinals, Integers
Théorie des ensembles	Théorie des ensembles	4	Structures	Theory of Sets	Theory of Sets	4	Structures
Théorie des ensembles	Théorie des ensembles	—	Fascicule de résultats	Theory of Sets	Theory of Sets	— (Note: The Summary of Results was a section that collected the Theory of Sets' main results, stating them without proof. Although it was the first item to be published in the Éléments, it does not count towards its chapters.)	Summary of Results
Algèbre	Algèbre: Chapitres 1 à 3	1	Structures algébriques	Algebra	Algebra I: Chapters 1-3	1	Algebraic Structures
Algèbre	Algèbre: Chapitres 1 à 3	2	Algèbre linéaire	Algebra	Algebra I: Chapters 1-3	2	Linear Algebra
Algèbre	Algèbre: Chapitres 1 à 3	3	Algèbres tensorielles, algèbres extérieures, algèbres symétriques	Algebra	Algebra I: Chapters 1-3	3	Tensor Algebras, Exterior Algebras, Symmetric Algebras
Algèbre	Algèbre: Chapitres 4 à 7	4	Polynômes et fractions rationnelles	Algebra	Algebra II: Chapters 4-7	4	Polynomials and Rational Fractions
Algèbre	Algèbre: Chapitres 4 à 7	5	Corps commutatifs	Algebra	Algebra II: Chapters 4-7	5	Commutative Fields
Algèbre	Algèbre: Chapitres 4 à 7	6	Groupes et corps ordonnés	Algebra	Algebra II: Chapters 4-7	6	Ordered Groups and Fields
Algèbre	Algèbre: Chapitres 4 à 7	7	Modules sur les anneaux principaux	Algebra	Algebra II: Chapters 4-7	7	Modules over Principal Ideal Domains
Algèbre	Algèbre: Chapitre 8	8	Modules et anneaux semi-simples	Algebra	Algebra: Chapter 8	8	Semi-simple Modules and Rings
Algèbre	Algèbre: Chapitre 9	9	Formes sesquilinéaires et formes quadratiques	Algebra	Unavailable in English	9	Sesquilinear and Quadratic Forms
Algèbre	Algèbre: Chapitre 10	10	Algèbre homologique	Algebra	Unavailable in English	10	Homological Algebra
Topologie générale	Topologie générale: Chapitres 1 à 4	1	Structures topologiques	General Topology	General Topology: Chapters 1-4	1	Topological Structures
Topologie générale	Topologie générale: Chapitres 1 à 4	2	Structures uniformes	General Topology	General Topology: Chapters 1-4	2	Uniform Structures
Topologie générale	Topologie générale: Chapitres 1 à 4	3	Groupes topologiques	General Topology	General Topology: Chapters 1-4	3	Topological Groups
Topologie générale	Topologie générale: Chapitres 1 à 4	4	Nombres réels	General Topology	General Topology: Chapters 1-4	4	Real Numbers
Topologie générale	Topologie générale: Chapitres 5 à 10	5	Groupes à un paramètre	General Topology	General Topology: Chapters 5-10	5	One-Parameter Groups
Topologie générale	Topologie générale: Chapitres 5 à 10	6	Espaces numériques et espaces projectifs	General Topology	General Topology: Chapters 5-10	6	Real Number Spaces and Projective Spaces
Topologie générale	Topologie générale: Chapitres 5 à 10	7	Les groupes additifs $\mathbf{R}^n$	General Topology	General Topology: Chapters 5-10	7	The Additive Groups $\mathbf{R}^n$
Topologie générale	Topologie générale: Chapitres 5 à 10	8	Nombres complexes	General Topology	General Topology: Chapters 5-10	8	Complex Numbers
Topologie générale	Topologie générale: Chapitres 5 à 10	9	Utilisation des nombres réels en topologie générale	General Topology	General Topology: Chapters 5-10	9	Use of Real Numbers in General Topology
Topologie générale	Topologie générale: Chapitres 5 à 10	10	Espaces fonctionnels	General Topology	General Topology: Chapters 5-10	10	Function Spaces
Fonctions d'une variable réelle	Fonctions d'une variable réelle	1	Dérivées	Functions of a Real Variable	Functions of a Real Variable: Elementary Theory	1	Derivatives
Fonctions d'une variable réelle	Fonctions d'une variable réelle	2	Primitives et intégrales	Functions of a Real Variable	Functions of a Real Variable: Elementary Theory	2	Primitives and Integrals
Fonctions d'une variable réelle	Fonctions d'une variable réelle	3	Fonctions élémentaires	Functions of a Real Variable	Functions of a Real Variable: Elementary Theory	3	Elementary Functions
Fonctions d'une variable réelle	Fonctions d'une variable réelle	4	Équations différentielles	Functions of a Real Variable	Functions of a Real Variable: Elementary Theory	4	Differential Equations
Fonctions d'une variable réelle	Fonctions d'une variable réelle	5	Etude locale des fonctions	Functions of a Real Variable	Functions of a Real Variable: Elementary Theory	5	Local Study of Functions
Fonctions d'une variable réelle	Fonctions d'une variable réelle	6	Développements tayloriens généralisés, formule sommatoire d'Euler-Maclaurin	Functions of a Real Variable	Functions of a Real Variable: Elementary Theory	6	Generalized Taylor Expansions, The Euler-Maclaurin Summation Formula
Fonctions d'une variable réelle	Fonctions d'une variable réelle	7	La fonction gamma	Functions of a Real Variable	Functions of a Real Variable: Elementary Theory	7	The Gamma Function
Espaces vectoriels topologiques	Espaces vectoriels topologiques: Chapitres 1 à 5	1	Espaces vectoriels topologiques sur un corps valué	Topological Vector Spaces	Topological Vector Spaces: Chapters 1-5	1	Topological Vector Spaces over a Valued Division Ring
Espaces vectoriels topologiques	Espaces vectoriels topologiques: Chapitres 1 à 5	2	Ensembles convexes et espaces localement convexes	Topological Vector Spaces	Topological Vector Spaces: Chapters 1-5	2	Convex Sets and Locally Convex Spaces
Espaces vectoriels topologiques	Espaces vectoriels topologiques: Chapitres 1 à 5	3	Espaces d'applications linéaires continues	Topological Vector Spaces	Topological Vector Spaces: Chapters 1-5	3	Spaces of Continuous Linear Mappings
Espaces vectoriels topologiques	Espaces vectoriels topologiques: Chapitres 1 à 5	4	La dualité dans les espaces vectoriels topologiques	Topological Vector Spaces	Topological Vector Spaces: Chapters 1-5	4	Duality in Topological Vector Spaces
Espaces vectoriels topologiques	Espaces vectoriels topologiques: Chapitres 1 à 5	5	Espaces hilbertiens (théorie élémentaire)	Topological Vector Spaces	Topological Vector Spaces: Chapters 1-5	5	Hilbertian Spaces (Elementary Theory)
Espaces vectoriels topologiques	Espaces vectoriels topologiques: Chapitres 6 et 7	6	Produits tensoriels topologiques	Topological Vector Spaces	Unavailable in English	6	Topological Tensor Products
Espaces vectoriels topologiques	Espaces vectoriels topologiques: Chapitres 6 et 7	7	Applications et espaces nucléaires	Topological Vector Spaces	Unavailable in English	7	Nuclear Maps and Spaces
Intégration	Intégration: Chapitres 1 à 4	1	Inégalités de convexité	Integration	Integration I: Chapters 1-6	1	Inequalities of Convexity
Intégration	Intégration: Chapitres 1 à 4	2	Espaces de Riesz	Integration	Integration I: Chapters 1-6	2	Riesz Spaces
Intégration	Intégration: Chapitres 1 à 4	3	Mesures sur les espaces localement compacts	Integration	Integration I: Chapters 1-6	3	Measures on Locally Compact Spaces
Intégration	Intégration: Chapitres 1 à 4	4	Prolongement d'une mesure et espaces $L^p$	Integration	Integration I: Chapters 1-6	4	Extension of a Measure, $L^p$ Spaces
Intégration	Intégration: Chapitre 5	5	Intégration des mesures	Integration	Integration I: Chapters 1-6	5	Integration of Measures
Intégration	Intégration: Chapitre 6	6	Intégration vectorielle	Integration	Integration I: Chapters 1-6	6	Vectorial Integration
Intégration	Intégration: Chapitres 7 et 8	7	Mesure de Haar	Integration	Integration II: Chapters 7-9	7	Haar Measure
Intégration	Intégration: Chapitres 7 et 8	8	Convolution et représentations	Integration	Integration II: Chapters 7-9	8	Convolution and Representations
Intégration	Intégration: Chapitre 9	9	Mesures sur les espaces topologiques séparés	Integration	Integration II: Chapters 7-9	9	Measures on Hausdorff Topological Spaces
Groupes et algèbres de Lie	Groupes et algèbres de Lie: Chapitre 1	1	Algèbres de Lie	Lie Groups and Lie Algebras	Lie Groups and Lie Algebras: Chapters 1-3	1	Lie Algebras
Groupes et algèbres de Lie	Groupes et algèbres de Lie: Chapitres 2 et 3	2	Algèbres de Lie libres	Lie Groups and Lie Algebras	Lie Groups and Lie Algebras: Chapters 1-3	2	Free Lie Algebras
Groupes et algèbres de Lie	Groupes et algèbres de Lie: Chapitres 2 et 3	3	Groupes de Lie	Lie Groups and Lie Algebras	Lie Groups and Lie Algebras: Chapters 1-3	3	Lie Groups
Groupes et algèbres de Lie	Groupes et algèbres de Lie: Chapitres 4 à 6	4	Groupes de Coxeter et systèmes de Tits	Lie Groups and Lie Algebras	Lie Groups and Lie Algebras: Chapters 4-6	4	Coxeter Groups and Tits Systems
Groupes et algèbres de Lie	Groupes et algèbres de Lie: Chapitres 4 à 6	5	Groupes engendrés par des réflexions	Lie Groups and Lie Algebras	Lie Groups and Lie Algebras: Chapters 4-6	5	Groups Generated by Reflections
Groupes et algèbres de Lie	Groupes et algèbres de Lie: Chapitres 4 à 6	6	Systèmes de racines	Lie Groups and Lie Algebras	Lie Groups and Lie Algebras: Chapters 4-6	6	Root Systems
Groupes et algèbres de Lie	Groupes et algèbres de Lie: Chapitres 7 et 8	7	Sous-algèbres de Cartan et éléments réguliers	Lie Groups and Lie Algebras	Lie Groups and Lie Algebras: Chapters 7-9	7	Cartan Subalgebras and Regular Elements
Groupes et algèbres de Lie	Groupes et algèbres de Lie: Chapitres 7 et 8	8	Algèbres de Lie semi-simples déployées	Lie Groups and Lie Algebras	Lie Groups and Lie Algebras: Chapters 7-9	8	Split Semi-simple Lie Algebras
Groupes et algèbres de Lie	Groupes et algèbres de Lie: Chapitre 9	9	Groupes de Lie réels compacts	Lie Groups and Lie Algebras	Lie Groups and Lie Algebras: Chapters 7-9	9	Compact Real Lie Groups
Algèbre commutative	Algèbre commutative: Chapitres 1 à 4	1	Modules plats	Commutative Algebra	Commutative Algebra: Chapters 1-7	1	Flat Modules
Algèbre commutative	Algèbre commutative: Chapitres 1 à 4	2	Localisation	Commutative Algebra	Commutative Algebra: Chapters 1-7	2	Localization
Algèbre commutative	Algèbre commutative: Chapitres 1 à 4	3	Graduations, filtrations et topologies	Commutative Algebra	Commutative Algebra: Chapters 1-7	3	Graduations, Filtrations and Topologies
Algèbre commutative	Algèbre commutative: Chapitres 1 à 4	4	Idéaux premiers associés et décomposition primaire	Commutative Algebra	Commutative Algebra: Chapters 1-7	4	Associated Prime Ideals and Primary Decomposition
Algèbre commutative	Algèbre commutative: Chapitres 5 à 7	5	Entiers	Commutative Algebra	Commutative Algebra: Chapters 1-7	5	Integers
Algèbre commutative	Algèbre commutative: Chapitres 5 à 7	6	Valuations	Commutative Algebra	Commutative Algebra: Chapters 1-7	6	Valuations
Algèbre commutative	Algèbre commutative: Chapitres 5 à 7	7	Diviseurs	Commutative Algebra	Commutative Algebra: Chapters 1-7	7	Divisors
Algèbre commutative	Algèbre commutative: Chapitres 8 et 9	8	Dimension	Commutative Algebra	Unavailable in English	8	Dimension
Algèbre commutative	Algèbre commutative: Chapitres 8 et 9	9	Anneaux locaux noethériens complets	Commutative Algebra	Unavailable in English	9	Complete Noetherian Local Rings
Algèbre commutative	Algèbre commutative: Chapitre 10	10	Profondeur, régularité, dualité	Commutative Algebra	Unavailable in English	10	Depth, Regularity, Duality
Théories spectrales	Théories spectrales: Chapitres 1 et 2	1	Algèbres normées	Spectral Theory	Unavailable in English	1	Normed Algebras
Théories spectrales	Théories spectrales: Chapitres 1 et 2	2	Groupes localement compacts commutatifs	Spectral Theory	Unavailable in English	2	Locally Compact Commutative Groups
Théories spectrales	Théories spectrales: Chapitres 3 à 5	3	Opérateurs compacts et perturbations	Spectral Theory	Unavailable in English	3	Compact operators and perturbations
Théories spectrales	Théories spectrales: Chapitres 3 à 5	4	Théorie spectrale hilbertienne	Spectral Theory	Unavailable in English	4	Hilbert's spectral theory
Théories spectrales	Théories spectrales: Chapitres 3 à 5	5	Représentations unitaires	Spectral Theory	Unavailable in English	5	Unitary representations
Variétés différentielles et analytiques	Variétés différentielles et analytiques	—	Fascicule de résultats	Differential and Analytic Manifolds	Unavailable in English	— (Note: Differential and Analytic Manifolds first appeared as two volumes of summaries of results, later compiled into a single volume. No proper proof-based chapters associated with the book's subject have been published.)	Summary of Results
Topologie algébrique	Topologie algébrique: Chapitres 1 à 4	1	Revêtements	Algebraic Topology	Unavailable in English	1	Covering Spaces
Topologie algébrique	Topologie algébrique: Chapitres 1 à 4	2	Groupoïdes	Algebraic Topology	Unavailable in English	2	Groupoids
Topologie algébrique	Topologie algébrique: Chapitres 1 à 4	3	Homotopie et groupoïde de Poincaré	Algebraic Topology	Unavailable in English	3	Homotopy and the Poincaré Groupoid
Topologie algébrique	Topologie algébrique: Chapitres 1 à 4	4	Espaces délaçables	Algebraic Topology	Unavailable in English	4	Deloopable Spaces
Éléments d'histoire des mathématiques		—	—	Elements of the History of Mathematics		— (Note: Elements of the History of Mathematics is a compilation volume of several of the historical note sections previously published in the Éléments proper. Although the volume is internally organized with 26 chapters, its reproduced historical content does not count toward the chapters of mathematical content within the Éléments.)	—

== See also ==
- Euclid's Elements
- Principia Mathematica
