= Jacob T. Schwartz =

American mathematician (1930-2009)

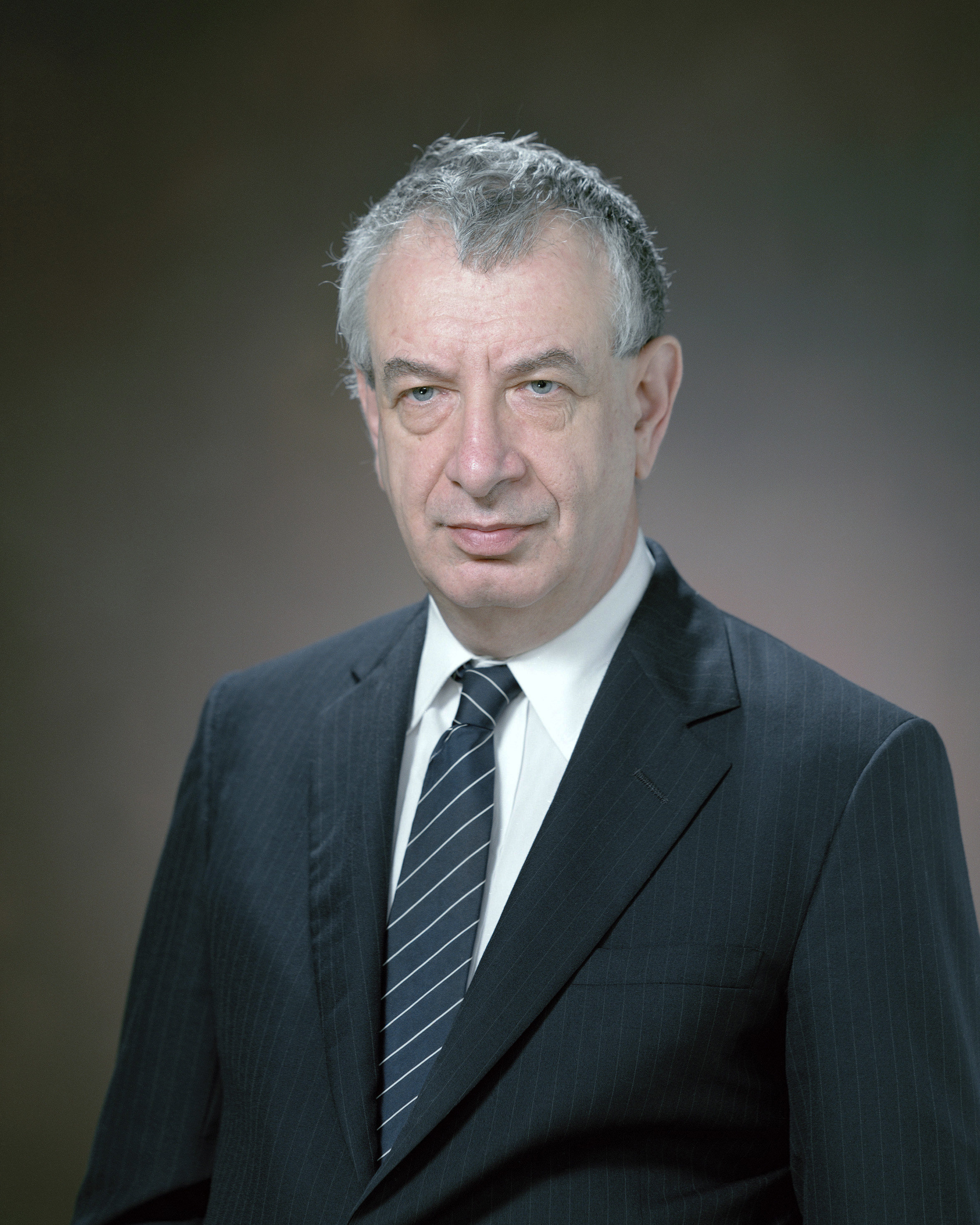
- Prof. Jacob T. Schwartz in 1987
- Born: January 9, 1930; The Bronx, New York
- Died: March 2, 2009 (aged 79); Manhattan, New York
- Education: City College of New York (B.S., 1949); Yale University (M.A., 1949; Ph.D., 1952)
- Known for: Dunford-Schwartz theorem
- Awards: Leroy P. Steele Prize (1981)
- Scientific career
- Fields: Applied mathematics Computer sciences
- Workplaces: Yale University; New York University
- Doctoral advisor: Nelson Dunford
- Doctoral students: Jerry Hobbs; Ken Kennedy; Robert Kupperman; Stanley Osher; Gian-Carlo Rota; Shmuel Winograd; Salvatore J. Stolfo

Jacob Theodore "Jack" Schwartz (January 9, 1930 – March 2, 2009) was an American mathematician, computer scientist, and professor of computer science at the New York University Courant Institute of Mathematical Sciences. He was the designer of the SETL programming language and started the NYU Ultracomputer project. He founded the New York University Department of Computer Science, chairing it from 1964 to 1980.

== Early life ==
Schwartz was born in The Bronx, New York on January 9, 1930, to Ignatz and Hedwig Schwartz. He attended Stuyvesant High School and went on to City College of New York.

== Education ==
Schwartz received his B.S. (1949) from the City College of New York and his M.A. (1949) and Ph.D. in mathematics (1952) from Yale University. His doctoral thesis was entitled Linear Elliptic Differential Operators and his thesis advisor was Nelson Dunford.

== Career ==
Schwartz's research interests included the theory of linear operators, von Neumann algebras, quantum field theory, time-sharing, parallel computing, programming language design and implementation, robotics, set-theoretic approaches in computational logic, proof and program verification systems; multimedia authoring tools; experimental studies of visual perception; multimedia and other high-level software techniques for analysis and visualization of bioinformatic data.

Schwartz authored 18 books and more than 100 papers and technical reports. He wrote the three-volume textbook Linear Operators with Nelson Dunford. He was also the inventor of the Artspeak programming language, which historically ran on mainframes and produced graphical output using a single-color graphical plotter.

Schwartz served as chairman of the Computer Science Department (which he founded) at the Courant Institute of Mathematical Sciences, New York University, from 1969 to 1977. He also served as chairman of the Computer Science Board of the National Research Council and was the former chairman of the National Science Foundation Advisory Committee for Information, Robotics and Intelligent Systems. From 1986 to 1989, he was the director of DARPA's Information Science and Technology Office (DARPA/ISTO) in Arlington, Virginia.

== Personal life ==
Schwartz was married to computer scientist Frances E. Allen from 1972 to 1982. He died of liver cancer in 2009 at age 79.

== Publications ==
- Nelson Dunford, Jacob T. Schwartz Linear Operators, Part I General Theory ISBN 0-471-60848-3, Part II Spectral Theory, Self Adjoint Operators in Hilbert Space ISBN 0-471-60847-5, Part III Spectral Operators ISBN 0-471-60846-7
- J. Schwartz (1956). "Riemann's method in the theory of special functions". Bull. Amer. Math. Soc. 62 (6): 531–540. doi:10.1090/s0002-9904-1956-10065-7. MR 0081360.
- Jacob T. Schwartz, Introduction to Matrices and Vectors, McGraw-Hill (1961), Dover Reprint (2001)
- Jacob T. Schwartz, Lectures on the Mathematical Method in Analytical Economics, Gordon and Breach (1961), Dover Reprint (2018)
- Jacob T. Schwartz, Relativity In Illustrations, New York University Press (1962), Dover Reprint (1989)
- Jacob T. Schwartz, Theory of money (Mathematics and its applications), Gordon and Breach (1965)
- Jacob T. Schwartz, W-* algebras (Notes on mathematics and its applications), Gordon and Breach (1967), ISBN 978-0-17-178707-8
- Jacob T. Schwartz (ed.), Mathematical Aspects of Computer Science, American Mathematical Society (1967)
- Jacob T. Schwartz, Nonlinear Functional Analysis, Gordon and Breach (1968)
- Jacob T. Schwartz, Differential Geometry and Topology, Gordon and Breach (1969)
- Schwartz, J.T.; Cocke, John, PROGRAMMING LANGUAGES AND THEIR COMPILERS : Preliminary Notes, Courant Institute of Mathematical Sciences, New York University, Second Revised Version, April 1970
- J. T. Schwartz (1974). "Semantic and syntactic issues in programming". Bull. Amer. Math. Soc. 80 (2): 185–206. doi:10.1090/s0002-9904-1974-13431-2. MR 0339536.
- J. T. Schwartz, A. Ferro, and E. G. Omodeo (1980). "Decision procedures for elementary sublanguages of set theory. I. Multi-level syllogistic and some extensions". Comm. Pure Appl. Math. 33 (5): 599–608. doi:10.1002/cpa.3160330503. MR 0573960.
- Jacob T. Schwartz, Robert B. K. Dewar, Programming With Sets: An Introduction to Setl, Springer (November 1986), ISBN 978-0-387-96399-0
- Jacob T. Schwartz, The Limits of Artificial Intelligence, found in the Encyclopedia of Artificial Intelligence, 2 vols., John Wiley and Sons, 1987
- Jacob T. Schwartz, Mark Kac, and Gian-Carlo Rota, Discrete Thoughts: Essays on Mathematics, Science, and Philosophy, Birkhäuser Boston; 2nd edition (January 11, 2008), ISBN 978-0-8176-4774-2
- Jacob T. Schwartz, Domenico Cantone, and Eugenio G. Omodeo, Computational logic and set theory: Applying formalized logic to analysis, Springer-Verlag, 2011. Foreword by Martin D. Davis. ISBN 978-0-85729-807-2

== Awards and honors ==
- Recipient Wilbur Cross Medal, Yale University
- Townsend Harris Medal, City University of New York
- Mayor's Medal for Contributions to Science and Technology, New York City, 1986
- Leroy P. Steele Prize, American Mathematical Society, August 1981 (shared with N. Dunford)
- Sloan Fellow, 1961–1962
- Distinguished Lecturer at the following Universities: University of California, Santa Barbara; Harvard University; MIT; Cornell University; University of Washington; University of Southern California; Trinity College, Dublin
- Elected to the National Academy of Sciences in 1976, and to the National Academy of Engineering in 2000.
