= Dunford–Schwartz theorem =

In mathematics, particularly functional analysis, the Dunford–Schwartz theorem, named after Nelson Dunford and Jacob T. Schwartz, states that the averages of powers of certain norm-bounded operators on L^{1} converge in a suitable sense.

== Statement ==
Let $T$ be a linear operator from $L^1$ to $L^1$ with $\|T\|_1 \le 1$ and $\|T\|_\infty \le 1$. Then

$$\lim_{n\rightarrow\infty}\frac{1}{n}\sum_{k=0}^{n-1}T^kf$$

exists almost everywhere for all $f\in L^1$.

The statement is no longer true when the boundedness condition is relaxed to even $\|T\|_\infty\le 1+\varepsilon$.
