= Nelson Dunford =

American mathematician

- Born: December 12, 1906; St. Louis, Missouri, US
- Died: September 7, 1986 (aged 79); Sarasota, Florida, US
- Education: Brown University
- Known for: Dunford decomposition Dunford–Pettis property Dunford–Pettis theorem Dunford–Schwartz theorem
- Awards: Leroy P. Steele Prize (1981)
- Scientific career
- Fields: Mathematics
- Workplaces: Yale University
- Doctoral advisor: Jacob Tamarkin
- Doctoral students: Shaul Foguel; Jacob T. Schwartz

Nelson James Dunford (December 12, 1906 – September 7, 1986) was an American mathematician, known for his work in functional analysis, namely integration of vector valued functions, ergodic theory, and linear operators. The Dunford decomposition, Dunford–Pettis property, and Dunford-Schwartz theorem bear his name.

He studied mathematics at the University of Chicago and obtained his Ph.D. in 1936 at Brown University under Jacob Tamarkin. He moved in 1939 to Yale University, where he remained until his retirement in 1960.

In 1981, he was awarded jointly with Jacob T. Schwartz, his Ph.D. student, the well-known Leroy P. Steele Prize of the American Mathematical Society for the three-volume work Linear Operators.

Nelson Dunford was coeditor of Transactions of the American Mathematical Society (1941–1945) and Mathematical Surveys and Monographs (1945–1949).

== Publications ==
- Dunford, Nelson; Schwartz, Jacob T. (1988). Linear Operators. Pure and applied mathematics. Vol. 1. New York: Wiley-Interscience. ISBN 978-0-471-60848-6. OCLC 18412261.
- Nelson Dunford, Jacob T. Schwartz, Linear Operators, Part I General Theory ISBN 0-471-60848-3, Part II Spectral Theory, Self Adjoint Operators in Hilbert Space ISBN 0-471-60847-5, Part III Spectral Operators ISBN 0-471-60846-7
