= Complete field =

In mathematics, a complete field is a field equipped with a metric and complete with respect to that metric. A field supports the elementary operations of addition, subtraction, multiplication, and division, while a metric represents the distance between two points in the set. Basic examples include the real numbers, the complex numbers, and complete valued fields (such as the p-adic numbers).

== Definitions ==
=== Field ===
A field is a set $F$ with binary operations $+$ and $\cdot$ (called addition and multiplication, respectively), along with elements $0$ and $1$ such that for all $a,b,c \in F$, the following relations hold:

1. $a+(b+c)=(a+b)+c$
2. $a+b=b+a$
3. $a+0=a=0+a$
4. $a+x=0$ has a solution
5. $a(bc)=(ab)c$
6. $ab=ba$
7. $a(b+c)=ab+ac$ and $(a+b)c=ac+bc$
8. $a1=a=1a$
9. $ax=1$ has a solution for $a \neq 0$

=== Complete metric ===
A metric on a set $F$ is a function $d: F^2 \to [0, \infty)$, that is, it takes two points in $F$ and sends them to a non-negative real number, such that the following relations hold for all $x,y,z \in F$:

1. $d(x,y) = 0$ if and only if $x=y$
2. $d(x,y)=d(y,x)$
3. $d(x,y) \leq d(x,z)+d(z,y)$

A sequence $x_n$ in the space is Cauchy with respect to this metric if for all $\epsilon > 0$ there exists an $N \in \mathbb{N}$ such that for all $n,m \geq N$ we have $d(x_n,x_m) < \epsilon$, and a metric is then complete if every Cauchy sequence in the metric space converges, that is, there is some $x \in F$ where for all $\epsilon > 0$ there exists an $N \in \mathbb{N}$ such that for all $n \geq N$ we have $d(x_n,x) < \epsilon$. Every convergent sequence is Cauchy, however the converse does not hold in general.

== Constructions ==
=== Real and complex numbers ===
The real numbers are the field with the standard Euclidean metric $|x-y|$, and this measure is complete. Extending the reals by adding the imaginary number $i$ satisfying $i^2=-1$ gives the field $\Complex$, which is also a complete field.

=== p-adic ===
The p-adic numbers are constructed from $\Q$ by using the p-adic absolute value

$v_p(a/b) = v_p(a) - v_p(b)$

where $a,b \in \Z.$ Then using the factorization $a = p^nc$ where $p$ does not divide $c,$ its valuation is the integer $n$. The completion of $\Q$ by $v_p$ is the complete field $\Q_p$ called the p-adic numbers. This is a case where the field is not algebraically closed. Typically, the process is to take the separable closure and then complete it again. This field is usually denoted $\Complex_p.$

== See also ==
- Completion (algebra) – In algebra, completion w.r.t. powers of an ideal
- Complete topological vector space – Structure in functional analysis
- Hensel's lemma – Theorem on polynomial roots modulo prime powers
- Henselian ring – Local ring in which Hensel's lemma holds
- Compact group – Topological group with compact topology
- Locally compact field
- Locally compact quantum group
- Locally compact group – Type of topological group in mathematics
- Ordered topological vector space
- Ostrowski's theorem – On all absolute values of rational numbers
- Topological abelian group
- Topological field – Algebraic structure with addition, multiplication, and division
- Topological group – Group that is a topological space with continuous group operations
- Topological module
- Topological ring
- Topological semigroup
- Topological vector space – Vector space with a notion of nearness
