= ADIC =

ADIC may refer to:

- Abu Dhabi Investment Council
- Advanced Digital Information Corporation
- ASEAN Defense Industry Collaboration
- Assistant director in charge

adic may refer to:

- adicity of an operation
- the I-adic filtration, I-adic completion, or I-adic topology of a ring or module with respect to some ideal I
- $p$-adic numbers, a concept in number theory
- adic spaces, in number theory
