= Completion of a ring =

In algebra, completion w.r.t. powers of an ideal

In abstract algebra, a completion is any of several related functors on rings and modules that result in complete topological rings and modules. Completion is similar to localization, and together they are among the most basic tools in analysing commutative rings. Complete commutative rings have a simpler structure than general ones, and Hensel's lemma applies to them. In algebraic geometry, a completion of a ring of functions R on a space X concentrates on a formal neighborhood of a point of X: heuristically, this is a neighborhood so small that all Taylor series centered at the point are convergent. An algebraic completion is constructed in a manner analogous to completion of a metric space with Cauchy sequences, and agrees with it in the case when R has a metric given by a non-Archimedean absolute value.

== General construction ==
Suppose that E is an abelian group with a descending filtration

$$E = F^0 E \supset F^1 E \supset F^2 E \supset \cdots \,$$

of subgroups. One then defines the completion (with respect to the filtration) as the inverse limit:

$$\widehat{E} = \varprojlim (E/F^n E)=\left\{\left.(\overline{a_n})_{n\geq0} \in \prod_{n\geq0}(E/F^nE) \;\right|\; a_i \equiv a_j\pmod{F^iE} \text{ for all } i \leq j\right\}. \,$$

This is again an abelian group. Usually E is an additive abelian group. If E has additional algebraic structure compatible with the filtration, for instance E is a filtered ring, a filtered module, or a filtered vector space, then its completion is again an object with the same structure that is complete in the topology determined by the filtration. This construction may be applied both to commutative and noncommutative rings. As may be expected, when the intersection of the $F^i E$ equals zero, this produces a complete topological ring.

== Krull topology ==
In commutative algebra, the filtration on a commutative ring R by the powers of a proper ideal I determines the Krull (after Wolfgang Krull) or I-adic topology on R. The case of a maximal ideal $I=\mathfrak{m}$ is especially important, for example the distinguished maximal ideal of a valuation ring. The basis of open neighbourhoods of 0 in R is given by the powers I^{n}, which are nested and form a descending filtration on R:

$$F^0 R = R\supset I\supset I^2\supset\cdots, \quad F^n R = I^n.$$

(Open neighborhoods of any r ∈ R are given by cosets r + I^{n}.) The (I-adic) completion is the inverse limit of the factor rings,

$$\widehat{R}_I=\varprojlim (R/I^n)$$

pronounced "R I hat". The kernel of the canonical map π from the ring to its completion is the intersection of the powers of I. Thus π is injective if and only if this intersection reduces to the zero element of the ring; by the Krull intersection theorem, this is the case for any commutative Noetherian ring which is an integral domain or a local ring.

There is a related topology on R-modules, also called Krull or I-adic topology. A basis of open neighborhoods of a module M is given by the sets of the form

$$x + I^n M \quad\text{for }x \in M.$$

The I-adic completion of an R-module M is the inverse limit of the quotients

$$\widehat{M}_I=\varprojlim (M/I^n M).$$

This procedure converts any module over R into a complete topological module over $\widehat{R}_I$ if I is finitely generated.

== Examples ==
- The ring of p-adic integers $\Z_p$ is obtained by completing the ring $\Z$ of integers at the ideal (p).
- Let R = K[x_{1},...,x_{n}] be the polynomial ring in n variables over a field K and $\mathfrak{m}=(x_1,\ldots,x_n)$ be the maximal ideal generated by the variables. Then the completion $\widehat{R}_{\mathfrak{m}}$ is the ring K[[x_{1},...,x_{n}]] of formal power series in n variables over K.
- Given a noetherian ring $R$ and an ideal $I = (f_1,\ldots, f_n),$ the $I$-adic completion of $R$ is an image of a formal power series ring, specifically, the image of the surjection

$$\begin{cases} R[[x_1, \ldots, x_n]] \to \widehat{R}_I \\ x_i \mapsto f_i \end{cases}$$

The kernel is the ideal $(x_1 - f_1, \ldots, x_n - f_n).$

Completions can also be used to analyze the local structure of singularities of a scheme. For example, the affine schemes associated to $\Complex[x,y]/(xy)$ and the nodal cubic plane curve $\Complex[x,y]/(y^2 - x^2(1+x))$ have similar looking singularities at the origin when viewing their graphs (both look like a plus sign). Notice that in the second case, any Zariski neighborhood of the origin is still an irreducible curve. If we use completions, then we are looking at a "small enough" neighborhood where the node has two components. Taking the localizations of these rings along the ideal $(x,y)$ and completing gives $\Complex[[x,y]]/(xy)$ and $\Complex[[x,y]]/((y+u)(y-u))$ respectively, where $u$ is the formal square root of $x^2(1+x)$ in $\Complex[[x,y]].$ More explicitly, the power series:

$$u = x\sqrt{1+x} = \sum_{n=0}^\infty \frac{(-1)^n(2n)!}{(1-2n)(n!)^2(4^n)}x^{n+1}.$$

Since both rings are given by the intersection of two ideals generated by a homogeneous degree 1 polynomial, we can see algebraically that the singularities "look" the same. This is because such a scheme is the union of two non-equal linear subspaces of the affine plane.

== Properties ==
- The completion of a Noetherian ring with respect to some ideal is a Noetherian ring.
- The completion of a Noetherian local ring with respect to the unique maximal ideal is a Noetherian local ring.
- The completion is a functorial operation: a continuous map $f\colon R\to S$ of topological rings gives rise to a map of their completions,
  $$\widehat{f}: \widehat{R}\to\widehat{S}.$$

Moreover, if $M$ and $N$ are two modules over the same topological ring $R$ and $f\colon M\to N$ is a continuous module map, then $f$ uniquely extends to the map of the completions:
$$\widehat{f}: \widehat{M}\to\widehat{N},$$
where $\widehat{M},\widehat{N}$ are modules over $\widehat{R}.$

- The completion of a Noetherian ring $R$ is a flat module over $R$.
- The completion of a finitely generated module $M$ over a Noetherian ring $R$ can be obtained by extension of scalars:

$$\widehat{M}=M\otimes_R \widehat{R}.$$

Together with the previous property, this implies that the functor of completion on finitely generated $R$-modules is exact: it preserves short exact sequences. In particular, taking quotients of rings commutes with completion, meaning that for any quotient $R$-algebra $R / I$, there is an isomorphism

$$\widehat{R / I} \cong \widehat R / \widehat I.$$

- Cohen structure theorem (equicharacteristic case). Let $R$ be a complete local Noetherian commutative ring with maximal ideal $\mathfrak{m}$ and residue field $\mathbb k$. If $R$ contains a field, then

$$R\simeq \mathbb k[[x_1,\ldots,x_n]]/I$$

for some $n$ and some ideal $I$ (Eisenbud, Theorem 7.7).

== See also ==
- Formal scheme
- Profinite integer
- Locally compact field
- Zariski ring
- Linear topology
- Quasi-unmixed ring
