= Linear topology =

In algebra, a linear topology on a left $A$-module $M$ is a topology on $M$ that is invariant under translations and admits a fundamental system of neighborhoods of $0$ that consist of submodules of $M.$ If there is such a topology, $M$ is said to be linearly topologized. If $A$ is given a discrete topology, then $M$ becomes a topological $A$-module with respect to a linear topology.

The notion is used more commonly in algebra than in analysis. Indeed, "[t]opological vector spaces with linear topology form a natural class of topological vector spaces over discrete fields, analogous to the class of locally convex topological vector spaces over the normed fields of real or complex numbers in functional analysis."

The term "linear topology" goes back to Lefschetz's work.

== Examples and non-examples ==
- For each prime number p, $\mathbb{Z}$ is linearly topologized by the fundamental system of neighborhoods $0 \in \cdots \subset p^2 \mathbb{Z} \subset p\mathbb{Z} \subset \mathbb{Z}$.
- Topological vector spaces appearing in functional analysis are typically not linearly topologized (since subspaces do not form a neighborhood system).

== See also ==
- Ordered topological vector space
- Ring of restricted power series – Formal power series with coefficients tending to 0
- Topological abelian group
- Topological field – Algebraic structure with addition, multiplication, and division
- Topological group – Group that is a topological space with continuous group operations
- Topological module
- Topological ring
- Topological semigroup
- Topological vector space – Vector space with a notion of nearness
