= Locally compact group =

Type of topological group in mathematics

In mathematics, a locally compact group is a topological group G for which the underlying topology is locally compact and Hausdorff. Locally compact groups are important because many examples of groups that arise throughout mathematics are locally compact and such groups have a natural measure called the Haar measure. This allows one to define integrals of Borel measurable functions on G so that standard analysis notions such as the Fourier transform and $L^p$ spaces can be generalized.

Many of the results of finite group representation theory are proved by averaging over the group. For compact groups, modifications of these proofs yields similar results by averaging with respect to the normalized Haar integral. In the general locally compact setting, such techniques need not hold. The resulting theory is a central part of harmonic analysis. The representation theory for locally compact abelian groups is described by Pontryagin duality.

== Examples and counterexamples ==
- Any compact group is locally compact.
  - In particular the circle group S^{1} of complex numbers of unit modulus under multiplication is compact, and therefore locally compact. The circle group historically served as the first topologically nontrivial group to also have the property of local compactness, and as such motivated the search for the more general theory, presented here.
- Any discrete group is locally compact. The theory of locally compact groups therefore encompasses the theory of ordinary groups since any group becomes a topological group when given the discrete topology.
- The additive groups of the real numbers R and of the complex numbers C, if given their standard topologies, are locally compact, as are the multiplicative groups of non-zero numbers R^{x} and C^{x}.
- Lie groups, which are locally Euclidean, are locally compact. Here we find many examples of non-abelian locally compact groups.
- A normable topological vector space over a local field is locally compact if and only if it is finite-dimensional.
- The additive group of rational numbers Q is not locally compact if given its standard topology, the relative topology as a subset of the real numbers. It is locally compact if given the discrete topology.
- The additive group of p-adic numbers Q_{p} with its standard topology is locally compact for any prime number p.

== Properties ==
By homogeneity, local compactness of the underlying space for a topological group need only be checked at the identity. That is, a group G is a locally compact space if and only if the identity element has a compact neighborhood. It follows that there is a local base of compact neighborhoods at every point.

Every closed subgroup of a locally compact group is locally compact. (The closure condition is necessary as the group of rationals demonstrates.) Conversely, every locally compact subgroup of a Hausdorff group is closed. Every quotient of a locally compact group is locally compact. The product of a family of locally compact groups is locally compact if and only if all but a finite number of factors are actually compact.

Topological groups are always completely regular as topological spaces. Locally compact groups have the stronger property of being normal.

Every locally compact group which is T_{0} and first-countable is metrisable as a topological group (i.e. can be given a left-invariant metric compatible with the topology) and complete. If furthermore the space is second-countable, the metric can be chosen to be proper. (See the article on topological groups.)

In a Polish group G, the σ-algebra of Haar null sets satisfies the countable chain condition if and only if G is locally compact.

== Locally compact abelian groups ==
For any locally compact abelian (LCA) group A, the group of continuous homomorphisms

Hom(A, S^{1})

from A to the circle group is again locally compact. Pontryagin duality asserts that this functor induces an equivalence of categories

LCA^{op} → LCA.

This functor exchanges several properties of topological groups. For example, finite groups correspond to finite groups, compact groups correspond to discrete groups, and metrisable groups correspond to countable unions of compact groups (and vice versa in all statements).

LCA groups form an exact category, with admissible monomorphisms being closed subgroups and admissible epimorphisms being topological quotient maps. It is therefore possible to consider the K-theory spectrum of this category. Clausen (2017) has shown that it measures the difference between the algebraic K-theory of Z and R, the integers and the reals, respectively, in the sense that there is a homotopy fiber sequence

K(Z) → K(R) → K(LCA).

== See also ==
- Compact group – Topological group with compact topology
- Complete field
- Locally compact field
- Locally compact space – Type of topological space in mathematics
- Locally compact quantum group
- Ordered topological vector space
- Topological abelian group
- Topological field – Algebraic structure with addition, multiplication, and division
- Topological group – Group that is a topological space with continuous group operations
- Topological module
- Topological ring
- Topological semigroup
- Topological vector space – Vector space with a notion of nearness

== Sources ==
- Clausen, Dustin (2017), A K-theoretic approach to Artin maps, arXiv:1703.07842v2

=== Further reading ===
- Folland, Gerald B. (1995), A Course in Abstract Harmonic Analysis, CRC Press, ISBN 978-0-8493-8490-5.
- Pontri︠a︡gin, Lev Semenovich (1939). Topological groups. Translated by Lehmer, Emma. Princeton University Press. OCLC 65707155.
- Weil, Andr´e (1940). L'int´egration dans les groupes topologiques et ses applications [L'intégration dans les groupes topologiques et ses applications] (in French). Paris: Hermann. OCLC 490312990.
- Montgomery, Deane; Zippin, Leo (1955). Topological transformation groups. Interscience Publishers. ISBN 978-0-486-82449-9. OCLC 1019833944.
- Hewitt, Edwin; Ross, Kenneth A. (1963). "Abstract Harmonic Analysis". Grundlehren der Mathematischen Wissenschaften. I (115). doi:10.1007/978-3-662-26755-4. ISBN 978-3-662-24595-8. ISSN 0072-7830.
- Tao, Terence (2014-07-17). Hilbert's Fifth Problem and Related Topics. Graduate Studies in Mathematics. Vol. 153. Providence, Rhode Island: American Mathematical Society. doi:10.1090/gsm/153. ISBN 978-1-4704-1564-8.
- Tao, Terence (2011-08-17). Notes on local groups. What's new.
