= Topological vector space =

Vector space with a notion of nearness

In mathematics, a topological vector space (also called a linear topological space and commonly abbreviated TVS or t.v.s.) is one of the basic structures investigated in functional analysis. A topological vector space is a vector space that is also a topological space with the property that the vector space operations (vector addition and scalar multiplication) are also continuous functions. Such a topology is called a vector topology and every topological vector space has a uniform topological structure, allowing a notion of uniform convergence and completeness. Some authors also require that the space is a Hausdorff space (although this article does not). One of the most widely studied categories of TVSs are locally convex topological vector spaces. This article focuses on TVSs that are not necessarily locally convex. Other well-known examples of TVSs include Banach spaces, Hilbert spaces and Sobolev spaces.

Many topological vector spaces are spaces of functions, or linear operators acting on topological vector spaces, and the topology is often defined so as to capture a particular notion of convergence of sequences of functions.

In this article, the scalar field of a topological vector space will be assumed to be either the complex numbers $\Complex$ or the real numbers $\R,$ unless clearly stated otherwise.

== Motivation ==
=== Normed spaces ===
Every normed vector space has a natural topological structure: the norm induces a metric and the metric induces a topology. This is a topological vector space because:

1. The vector addition map $\cdot\, + \,\cdot\; : X \times X \to X$ defined by $(x, y) \mapsto x + y$ is (jointly) continuous with respect to this topology. This follows directly from the triangle inequality obeyed by the norm.
2. The scalar multiplication map $\cdot : \mathbb{K} \times X \to X$ defined by $(s, x) \mapsto s \cdot x,$ where $\mathbb{K}$ is the underlying scalar field of $X,$ is (jointly) continuous. This follows from the triangle inequality and homogeneity of the norm.

Thus all Banach spaces and Hilbert spaces are examples of topological vector spaces.

=== Non-normed spaces ===
There are topological vector spaces whose topology is not induced by a norm, but are still of interest in analysis. Examples of such spaces are spaces of holomorphic functions on an open domain, spaces of infinitely differentiable functions, the Schwartz spaces, and spaces of test functions and the spaces of distributions on them. These are all examples of Montel spaces. An infinite-dimensional Montel space is never normable. The existence of a norm for a given topological vector space is characterized by Kolmogorov's normability criterion.

A topological field is a topological vector space over each of its subfields.

== Definition ==
A family of neighborhoods of the origin with the above two properties determines uniquely a topological vector space. The system of neighborhoods of any other point in the vector space is obtained by translation.

A topological vector space (TVS) $X$ is a vector space over a topological field $\mathbb{K}$ (most often the real or complex numbers with their standard topologies) that is endowed with a topology such that vector addition $\cdot\, + \,\cdot\; : X \times X \to X$ and scalar multiplication $\cdot : \mathbb{K} \times X \to X$ are continuous functions (where the domains of these functions are endowed with product topologies). Such a topology is called a vector topology or a TVS topology on $X.$

Every topological vector space is also a commutative topological group under addition.

Hausdorff assumption

Many authors (for example, Walter Rudin), but not this page, require the topology on $X$ to be T_{1}; it then follows that the space is Hausdorff, and even Tychonoff. A topological vector space is said to be separated if it is Hausdorff; importantly, "separated" does not mean separable. The topological and linear algebraic structures can be tied together even more closely with additional assumptions, the most common of which are listed below.

Category and morphisms

The category of topological vector spaces over a given topological field $\mathbb{K}$ is commonly denoted $\mathrm{TVS}_\mathbb{K}$ or $\mathrm{TVect}_\mathbb{K}.$ The objects are the topological vector spaces over $\mathbb{K}$ and the morphisms are the continuous $\mathbb{K}$-linear maps from one object to another.

A topological vector space homomorphism (abbreviated TVS homomorphism), also called a topological homomorphism, is a continuous linear map $u : X \to Y$ between topological vector spaces (TVSs) such that the induced map $u : X \to \operatorname{Im} u$ is an open mapping when $\operatorname{Im} u := u(X),$ which is the range or image of $u,$ is given the subspace topology induced by $Y.$

A topological vector space embedding (abbreviated TVS embedding), also called a topological monomorphism, is an injective topological homomorphism. Equivalently, a TVS-embedding is a linear map that is also a topological embedding.

A topological vector space isomorphism (abbreviated TVS isomorphism), also called a topological vector isomorphism or an isomorphism in the category of TVSs, is a bijective linear homeomorphism. Equivalently, it is a surjective TVS embedding

Many properties of TVSs that are studied, such as local convexity, metrizability, completeness, and normability, are invariant under TVS isomorphisms.

A necessary condition for a vector topology

A collection $\mathcal{N}$ of subsets of a vector space is called additive if for every $N \in \mathcal{N},$ there exists some $U \in \mathcal{N}$ such that $U + U \subseteq N.$

Characterization of continuity of addition at $0$—If $(X, +)$ is a group (as all vector spaces are), $\tau$ is a topology on $X,$ and $X \times X$ is endowed with the product topology, then the addition map $X \times X \to X$ (defined by $(x, y) \mapsto x + y$) is continuous at the origin of $X \times X$ if and only if the set of neighborhoods of the origin in $(X, \tau)$ is additive. This statement remains true if the word "neighborhood" is replaced by "open neighborhood."

All of the above conditions are consequently a necessity for a topology to form a vector topology.

=== Defining topologies using neighborhoods of the origin ===
Since every vector topology is translation invariant (which means that for all $x_0 \in X,$ the map $X \to X$ defined by $x \mapsto x_0 + x$ is a homeomorphism), to define a vector topology it suffices to define a neighborhood basis (or subbasis) for it at the origin.

Theorem (Neighborhood filter of the origin)—Suppose that $X$ is a real or complex vector space. If $\mathcal{B}$ is a non-empty additive collection of balanced and absorbing subsets of $X$ then $\mathcal{B}$ is a neighborhood base at $0$ for a vector topology on $X.$ That is, the assumptions are that $\mathcal{B}$ is a filter base that satisfies the following conditions:

1. Every $B \in \mathcal{B}$ is balanced and absorbing,
2. $\mathcal{B}$ is additive: For every $B \in \mathcal{B}$ there exists a $U \in \mathcal{B}$ such that $U + U \subseteq B,$

If $\mathcal{B}$ satisfies the above two conditions but is not a filter base then it will form a neighborhood subbasis at $0$ (rather than a neighborhood basis) for a vector topology on $X.$

In general, the set of all balanced and absorbing subsets of a vector space does not satisfy the conditions of this theorem and does not form a neighborhood basis at the origin for any vector topology.

=== Defining topologies using strings ===
Let $X$ be a vector space and let $U_{\bull} = \left(U_i\right)_{i = 1}^{\infty}$ be a sequence of subsets of $X.$ Each set in the sequence $U_{\bull}$ is called a knot of $U_{\bull}$ and for every index $i,$ $U_i$ is called the $i$-th knot of $U_{\bull}.$ The set $U_1$ is called the beginning of $U_{\bull}.$ The sequence $U_{\bull}$ is/is a:

- Summative if $U_{i+1} + U_{i+1} \subseteq U_i$ for every index $i.$
- Balanced (resp. absorbing, closed, (Note: The topological properties of course also require that $X$ be a TVS.) convex, open, symmetric, barrelled, absolutely convex/disked, etc.) if this is true of every $U_i.$
- String if $U_{\bull}$ is summative, absorbing, and balanced.
- Topological string or a neighborhood string in a TVS $X$ if $U_{\bull}$ is a string and each of its knots is a neighborhood of the origin in $X.$

If $U$ is an absorbing disk in a vector space $X$ then the sequence defined by $U_i := 2^{1-i} U$ forms a string beginning with $U_1 = U.$ This is called the natural string of $U$ Moreover, if a vector space $X$ has countable dimension then every string contains an absolutely convex string.

Summative sequences of sets have the particularly nice property that they define non-negative continuous real-valued subadditive functions. These functions can then be used to prove many of the basic properties of topological vector spaces.

Theorem ($\R$-valued function induced by a string)—Let $U_{\bull} = \left(U_i\right)_{i=0}^{\infty}$ be a collection of subsets of a vector space such that $0 \in U_i$ and $U_{i+1} + U_{i+1} \subseteq U_i$ for all $i \geq 0.$ For all $u \in U_0,$ let
$$\mathbb{S}(u) := \left\{n_{\bull} = \left(n_1, \ldots, n_k\right) ~:~ k \geq 1, n_i \geq 0 \text{ for all } i, \text{ and } u \in U_{n_1} + \cdots + U_{n_k}\right\}.$$

Define $f : X \to [0, 1]$ by $f(x) = 1$ if $x \not\in U_0$ and otherwise let
$$f(x) := \inf_{} \left\{2^{- n_1} + \cdots 2^{- n_k} ~:~ n_{\bull} = \left(n_1, \ldots, n_k\right) \in \mathbb{S}(x)\right\}.$$

Then $f$ is subadditive (meaning $f(x + y) \leq f(x) + f(y)$ for all $x, y \in X$) and $f = 0$ on $\bigcap_{i \geq 0} U_i;$ so in particular, $f(0) = 0.$ If all $U_i$ are symmetric sets then $f(-x) = f(x)$ and if all $U_i$ are balanced then $f(s x) \leq f(x)$ for all scalars $s$ such that $|s| \leq 1$ and all $x \in X.$ If $X$ is a topological vector space and if all $U_i$ are neighborhoods of the origin then $f$ is continuous, where if in addition $X$ is Hausdorff and $U_{\bull}$ forms a basis of balanced neighborhoods of the origin in $X$ then $d(x, y) := f(x - y)$ is a metric defining the vector topology on $X.$

A proof of the above theorem is given in the article on metrizable topological vector spaces.

If $U_{\bull} = \left(U_i\right)_{i \in \N}$ and $V_{\bull} = \left(V_i\right)_{i \in \N}$ are two collections of subsets of a vector space $X$ and if $s$ is a scalar, then by definition:

- $V_{\bull}$ contains $U_{\bull}$: $\ U_{\bull} \subseteq V_{\bull}$ if and only if $U_i \subseteq V_i$ for every index $i.$
- Set of knots: $\ \operatorname{Knots} U_{\bull} := \left\{U_i : i \in \N\right\}.$
- Kernel: $\ \ker U_{\bull} := \bigcap_{i \in \N} U_i.$
- Scalar multiple: $\ s U_{\bull} := \left(s U_i\right)_{i \in \N}.$
- Sum: $\ U_{\bull} + V_{\bull} := \left(U_i + V_i\right)_{i \in \N}.$
- Intersection: $\ U_{\bull} \cap V_{\bull} := \left(U_i \cap V_i\right)_{i \in \N}.$

If $\mathbb{S}$ is a collection sequences of subsets of $X,$ then $\mathbb{S}$ is said to be directed (downwards) under inclusion or simply directed downward if $\mathbb{S}$ is not empty and for all $U_{\bull}, V_{\bull} \in \mathbb{S},$ there exists some $W_{\bull} \in \mathbb{S}$ such that $W_{\bull} \subseteq U_{\bull}$ and $W_{\bull} \subseteq V_{\bull}$ (said differently, if and only if $\mathbb{S}$ is a prefilter with respect to the containment $\,\subseteq\,$ defined above).

Notation: Let $\operatorname{Knots} \mathbb{S} := \bigcup_{U_{\bull} \in \mathbb{S}} \operatorname{Knots} U_{\bull}$ be the set of all knots of all strings in $\mathbb{S}.$

Defining vector topologies using collections of strings is particularly useful for defining classes of TVSs that are not necessarily locally convex.

Theorem (Topology induced by strings)—If $(X, \tau)$ is a topological vector space then there exists a set $\mathbb{S}$ (Note: This condition is satisfied if $\mathbb{S}$ denotes the set of all topological strings in $(X, \tau).$) of neighborhood strings in $X$ that is directed downward and such that the set of all knots of all strings in $\mathbb{S}$ is a neighborhood basis at the origin for $(X, \tau).$ Such a collection of strings is said to be $\tau$ fundamental.

Conversely, if $X$ is a vector space and if $\mathbb{S}$ is a collection of strings in $X$ that is directed downward, then the set $\operatorname{Knots} \mathbb{S}$ of all knots of all strings in $\mathbb{S}$ forms a neighborhood basis at the origin for a vector topology on $X.$ In this case, this topology is denoted by $\tau_\mathbb{S}$ and it is called the topology generated by $\mathbb{S}.$

If $\mathbb{S}$ is the set of all topological strings in a TVS $(X, \tau)$ then $\tau_{\mathbb{S}} = \tau.$ A Hausdorff TVS is metrizable if and only if its topology can be induced by a single topological string.

== Topological structure ==
A vector space is an abelian group with respect to the operation of addition, and in a topological vector space the inverse operation is always continuous (since it is the same as multiplication by $-1$). Hence, every topological vector space is an abelian topological group. Every TVS is completely regular but a TVS need not be normal.

Let $X$ be a topological vector space. Given a subspace $M \subseteq X,$ the quotient space $X / M$ with the usual quotient topology is a Hausdorff topological vector space if and only if $M$ is closed. (Note: In particular, $X$ is Hausdorff if and only if the set $\{0\}$ is closed (that is, $X$ is a T_{1} space).) This permits the following construction: given a topological vector space $X$ (that is probably not Hausdorff), form the quotient space $X / M$ where $M$ is the closure of $\{0\}.$ $X / M$ is then a Hausdorff topological vector space that can be studied instead of $X.$

=== Invariance of vector topologies ===
One of the most used properties of vector topologies is that every vector topology is translation invariant:

for all $x_0 \in X,$ the map $X \to X$ defined by $x \mapsto x_0 + x$ is a homeomorphism, but if $x_0 \neq 0$ then it is not linear and so not a TVS-isomorphism.

Scalar multiplication by a non-zero scalar is a TVS-isomorphism. This means that if $s \neq 0$ then the linear map $X \to X$ defined by $x \mapsto s x$ is a homeomorphism. Using $s = -1$ produces the negation map $X \to X$ defined by $x \mapsto - x,$ which is consequently a linear homeomorphism and thus a TVS-isomorphism.

If $x \in X$ and any subset $S \subseteq X,$ then $\operatorname{cl}_X (x + S) = x + \operatorname{cl}_X S$ and moreover, if $0 \in S$ then $x + S$ is a neighborhood (resp. open neighborhood, closed neighborhood) of $x$ in $X$ if and only if the same is true of $S$ at the origin.

=== Local notions ===
A subset $E$ of a vector space $X$ is said to be

- absorbing (in $X$): if for every $x \in X,$ there exists a real $r > 0$ such that $c x \in E$ for any scalar $c$ satisfying $|c| \leq r.$
- balanced or circled: if $t E \subseteq E$ for every scalar $|t| \leq 1.$
- convex: if $t E + (1 - t) E \subseteq E$ for every real $0 \leq t \leq 1.$
- a disk or absolutely convex: if $E$ is convex and balanced.
- symmetric: if $- E \subseteq E,$ or equivalently, if $- E = E.$

Every neighborhood of the origin is an absorbing set and contains an open balanced neighborhood of $0$ so every topological vector space has a local base of absorbing and balanced sets. The origin even has a neighborhood basis consisting of closed balanced neighborhoods of $0;$ if the space is locally convex then it also has a neighborhood basis consisting of closed convex balanced neighborhoods of the origin.

Bounded subsets

A subset $E$ of a topological vector space $X$ is bounded if for every neighborhood $V$ of the origin there exists $t$ such that $E \subseteq t V$.

The definition of boundedness can be weakened a bit; $E$ is bounded if and only if every countable subset of it is bounded. A set is bounded if and only if each of its subsequences is a bounded set. Also, $E$ is bounded if and only if for every balanced neighborhood $V$ of the origin, there exists $t$ such that $E \subseteq t V.$

Moreover, when $X$ is locally convex, the boundedness can be characterized by seminorms: the subset $E$ is bounded if and only if every continuous seminorm $p$ is bounded on $E.$

Every totally bounded set is bounded. If $M$ is a vector subspace of a TVS $X,$ then a subset of $M$ is bounded in $M$ if and only if it is bounded in $X.$

=== Metrizability ===
Birkhoff–Kakutani theorem—If $(X, \tau)$ is a topological vector space then the following four conditions are equivalent: (Note: In fact, this is true for topological group, since the proof does not use the scalar multiplications.)

1. The origin $\{0\}$ is closed in $X$ and there is a countable basis of neighborhoods at the origin in $X.$
2. $(X, \tau)$ is metrizable (as a topological space).
3. There is a translation-invariant metric on $X$ that induces on $X$ the topology $\tau,$ which is the given topology on $X.$
4. $(X, \tau)$ is a metrizable topological vector space. (Note: Also called a metric linear space, which means that it is a real or complex vector space together with a translation-invariant metric for which addition and scalar multiplication are continuous.)

By the Birkhoff–Kakutani theorem, it follows that there is an equivalent metric that is translation-invariant.

A TVS is pseudometrizable if and only if it has a countable neighborhood basis at the origin, or equivalent, if and only if its topology is generated by an F-seminorm. A TVS is metrizable if and only if it is Hausdorff and pseudometrizable.

More strongly: a topological vector space is said to be normable if its topology can be induced by a norm. A topological vector space is normable if and only if it is Hausdorff and has a convex bounded neighborhood of the origin.

Let $\mathbb{K}$ be a non-discrete locally compact topological field, for example the real or complex numbers. A Hausdorff topological vector space over $\mathbb{K}$ is locally compact if and only if it is finite-dimensional, that is, isomorphic to $\mathbb{K}^n$ for some natural number $n.$

=== Completeness and uniform structure ===
The canonical uniformity on a TVS $(X, \tau)$ is the unique translation-invariant uniformity that induces the topology $\tau$ on $X.$

Every TVS is assumed to be endowed with this canonical uniformity, which makes all TVSs into uniform spaces. Therefore making sense to related notions such as completeness, uniform convergence, Cauchy nets, and uniform continuity, etc., which are always assumed to be with respect to this uniformity (unless indicated other). This implies that every Hausdorff topological vector space is Tychonoff. A subset of a TVS is compact if and only if it is complete and totally bounded (for Hausdorff TVSs, a set being totally bounded is equivalent to it being precompact). But if the TVS is not Hausdorff then there exist compact subsets that are not closed. However, the closure of a compact subset of a non-Hausdorff TVS is again compact (so compact subsets are relatively compact).

With respect to this uniformity, a net (or sequence) $x_{\bull} = \left(x_i\right)_{i \in I}$ is Cauchy if and only if for every neighborhood $V$ of $0,$ there exists some index $n$ such that $x_i - x_j \in V$ whenever $i \geq n$ and $j \geq n.$

Every Cauchy sequence is bounded, although Cauchy nets and Cauchy filters may not be bounded. A topological vector space where every Cauchy sequence converges is called sequentially complete; in general, it may not be complete (in the sense that all Cauchy filters converge).

The vector space operation of addition is uniformly continuous and an open map. Scalar multiplication is Cauchy continuous but in general, it is almost never uniformly continuous. Because of this, every topological vector space can be completed and is thus a dense linear subspace of a complete topological vector space.

- Every TVS has a completion and every Hausdorff TVS has a Hausdorff completion. Every TVS (even those that are Hausdorff and/or complete) has infinitely many non-isomorphic non-Hausdorff completions.
- A compact subset of a TVS (not necessarily Hausdorff) is complete. A complete subset of a Hausdorff TVS is closed.
- If $C$ is a complete subset of a TVS then any subset of $C$ that is closed in $C$ is complete.
- A Cauchy sequence in a Hausdorff TVS $X$ is not necessarily relatively compact (that is, its closure in $X$ is not necessarily compact).
- If a Cauchy filter in a TVS has an accumulation point $x$ then it converges to $x.$
- If a series $\sum_{i=1}^{\infty} x_i$ converges (Note: A series $\sum_{i=1}^{\infty} x_i$ is said to converge in a TVS $X$ if the sequence of partial sums converges.) in a TVS $X$ then $x_{\bull} \to 0$ in $X.$

== Examples ==
=== Finest and coarsest vector topology ===
Let $X$ be a real or complex vector space.

Trivial topology

The trivial topology or indiscrete topology $\{X, \varnothing\}$ is always a TVS topology on any vector space $X$ and it is the coarsest TVS topology possible. An important consequence of this is that the intersection of any collection of TVS topologies on $X$ always contains a TVS topology. Any vector space (including those that are infinite dimensional) endowed with the trivial topology is a compact (and thus locally compact) complete pseudometrizable seminormable locally convex topological vector space. It is Hausdorff if and only if $\dim X = 0.$

Finest vector topology

There exists a TVS topology $\tau_f$ on $X,$ called the finest vector topology on $X,$ that is finer than every other TVS-topology on $X$ (that is, any TVS-topology on $X$ is necessarily a subset of $\tau_f$). Every linear map from $\left(X, \tau_f\right)$ into another TVS is necessarily continuous. If $X$ has an uncountable Hamel basis then $\tau_f$ is not locally convex and not metrizable.

=== Cartesian products ===
A Cartesian product of a family of topological vector spaces, when endowed with the product topology, is a topological vector space. Consider for instance the set $X$ of all functions $f: \R \to \R$ where $\R$ carries its usual Euclidean topology. This set $X$ is a real vector space (where addition and scalar multiplication are defined pointwise, as usual) that can be identified with (and indeed, is often defined to be) the Cartesian product $\R^\R,$ which carries the natural product topology. With this product topology, $X := \R^{\R}$ becomes a topological vector space whose topology is called the topology of pointwise convergence on $\R.$ The reason for this name is the following: if $\left(f_n\right)_{n=1}^{\infty}$ is a sequence (or more generally, a net) of elements in $X$ and if $f \in X$ then $f_n$ converges to $f$ in $X$ if and only if for every real number $x,$ $f_n(x)$ converges to $f(x)$ in $\R.$ This TVS is complete, Hausdorff, and locally convex but not metrizable and consequently not normable; indeed, every neighborhood of the origin in the product topology contains lines (that is, 1-dimensional vector subspaces, which are subsets of the form $\R f := \{r f : r \in \R\}$ with $f \neq 0$).

=== Finite-dimensional spaces ===
By F. Riesz's theorem, a Hausdorff topological vector space is finite-dimensional if and only if it is locally compact, which happens if and only if it has a compact neighborhood of the origin.

Let $\mathbb{K}$ denote $\R$ or $\Complex$ and endow $\mathbb{K}$ with its usual Hausdorff normed Euclidean topology. Let $X$ be a vector space over $\mathbb{K}$ of finite dimension $n := \dim X$ and so that $X$ is vector space isomorphic to $\mathbb{K}^n$ (explicitly, this means that there exists a linear isomorphism between the vector spaces $X$ and $\mathbb{K}^n$). This finite-dimensional vector space $X$ always has a unique Hausdorff vector topology, which makes it TVS-isomorphic to $\mathbb{K}^n,$ where $\mathbb{K}^n$ is endowed with the usual Euclidean topology (which is the same as the product topology). This Hausdorff vector topology is also the (unique) finest vector topology on $X.$ $X$ has a unique vector topology if and only if $\dim X = 0.$ If $\dim X \neq 0$ then although $X$ does not have a unique vector topology, it does have a unique Hausdorff vector topology.

- If $\dim X = 0$ then $X = \{0\}$ has exactly one vector topology: the trivial topology, which in this case (and only in this case) is Hausdorff. The trivial topology on a vector space is Hausdorff if and only if the vector space has dimension $0.$
- If $\dim X = 1$ then $X$ has two vector topologies: the usual Euclidean topology and the (non-Hausdorff) trivial topology.
  - Since the field $\mathbb{K}$ is itself a $1$-dimensional topological vector space over $\mathbb{K}$ and since it plays an important role in the definition of topological vector spaces, this dichotomy plays an important role in the definition of an absorbing set and has consequences that reverberate throughout functional analysis.
Proof outline

The proof of this dichotomy (i.e. that a vector topology is either trivial or isomorphic to $\mathbb{K}$) is straightforward so only an outline with the important observations is given. As usual, $\mathbb{K}$ is assumed have the (normed) Euclidean topology. Let $B_r := \{a \in \mathbb{K} : |a| < r\}$ for all $r > 0.$ Let $X$ be a $1$-dimensional vector space over $\mathbb{K}.$ If $S \subseteq X$ and $B \subseteq \mathbb{K}$ is a ball centered at $0$ then $B \cdot S = X$ whenever $S$ contains an "unbounded sequence", by which it is meant a sequence of the form $\left(a_i x\right)_{i=1}^{\infty}$ where $0 \neq x \in X$ and $\left(a_i\right)_{i=1}^{\infty} \subseteq \mathbb{K}$ is unbounded in normed space $\mathbb{K}$ (in the usual sense). Any vector topology on $X$ will be translation invariant and invariant under non-zero scalar multiplication, and for every $0 \neq x \in X,$ the map $M_x : \mathbb{K} \to X$ given by $M_x(a) := a x$ is a continuous linear bijection. Because $X = \mathbb{K} x$ for any such $x,$ every subset of $X$ can be written as $F x = M_x(F)$ for some unique subset $F \subseteq \mathbb{K}.$ And if this vector topology on $X$ has a neighborhood $W$ of the origin that is not equal to all of $X,$ then the continuity of scalar multiplication $\mathbb{K} \times X \to X$ at the origin guarantees the existence of an open ball $B_r \subseteq \mathbb{K}$ centered at $0$ and an open neighborhood $S$ of the origin in $X$ such that $B_r \cdot S \subseteq W \neq X,$ which implies that $S$ does not contain any "unbounded sequence". This implies that for every $0 \neq x \in X,$ there exists some positive integer $n$ such that $S \subseteq B_n x.$ From this, it can be deduced that if $X$ does not carry the trivial topology and if $0 \neq x \in X,$ then for any ball $B \subseteq \mathbb{K}$ center at 0 in $\mathbb{K},$ $M_x(B) = B x$ contains an open neighborhood of the origin in $X,$ which then proves that $M_x$ is a linear homeomorphism. Q.E.D. $\blacksquare$

- If $\dim X = n \geq 2$ then $X$ has infinitely many distinct vector topologies:
  - Some of these topologies are now described: Every linear functional $f$ on $X,$ which is vector space isomorphic to $\mathbb{K}^n,$ induces a seminorm $|f| : X \to \R$ defined by $|f|(x) = |f(x)|$ where $\ker f = \ker |f|.$ Every seminorm induces a (pseudometrizable locally convex) vector topology on $X$ and seminorms with distinct kernels induce distinct topologies so that in particular, seminorms on $X$ that are induced by linear functionals with distinct kernels will induce distinct vector topologies on $X.$
  - However, while there are infinitely many vector topologies on $X$ when $\dim X \geq 2,$ there are, up to TVS-isomorphism, only $1 + \dim X$ vector topologies on $X.$ For instance, if $n := \dim X = 2$ then the vector topologies on $X$ consist of the trivial topology, the Hausdorff Euclidean topology, and then the infinitely many remaining non-trivial non-Euclidean vector topologies on $X$ are all TVS-isomorphic to one another.

=== Non-vector topologies ===
Discrete and cofinite topologies

If $X$ is a non-trivial vector space (that is, of non-zero dimension) then the discrete topology on $X$ (which is always metrizable) is not a TVS topology because despite making addition and negation continuous (which makes it into a topological group under addition), it fails to make scalar multiplication continuous. The cofinite topology on $X$ (where a subset is open if and only if its complement is finite) is also not a TVS topology on $X.$

== Linear maps ==
A linear operator between two topological vector spaces which is continuous at one point is continuous on the whole domain. Moreover, a linear operator $f$ is continuous if $f(X)$ is bounded (as defined below) for some neighborhood $X$ of the origin.

A hyperplane in a topological vector space $X$ is either dense or closed. A linear functional $f$ on a topological vector space $X$ has either dense or closed kernel. Moreover, $f$ is continuous if and only if its kernel is closed.

== Types ==
Depending on the application additional constraints are usually enforced on the topological structure of the space. In fact, several principal results in functional analysis fail to hold in general for topological vector spaces: the closed graph theorem, the open mapping theorem, and the fact that the dual space of the space separates points in the space.

Below are some common topological vector spaces, roughly in order of increasing "niceness."

- F-spaces are complete topological vector spaces with a translation-invariant metric. These include $L^p$ spaces for all $p > 0.$
- Locally convex topological vector spaces: here each point has a local base consisting of convex sets. By a technique known as Minkowski functionals it can be shown that a space is locally convex if and only if its topology can be defined by a family of seminorms. Local convexity is the minimum requirement for "geometrical" arguments like the Hahn–Banach theorem. The $L^p$ spaces are locally convex (in fact, Banach spaces) for all $p \geq 1,$ but not for $0 < p < 1.$
- Barrelled spaces: locally convex spaces where the Banach–Steinhaus theorem holds.
- Bornological space: a locally convex space where the continuous linear operators to any locally convex space are exactly the bounded linear operators.
- Stereotype space: a locally convex space satisfying a variant of reflexivity condition, where the dual space is endowed with the topology of uniform convergence on totally bounded sets.
- Montel space: a barrelled space where every closed and bounded set is compact
- Fréchet spaces: these are complete locally convex spaces where the topology comes from a translation-invariant metric, or equivalently: from a countable family of seminorms. Many interesting spaces of functions fall into this class -- $C^\infty(\R)$ is a Fréchet space under the seminorms $\|f\|_{k,\ell} = \sup_{x\in[-k,k]} |f^{(\ell)}(x)|.$ A locally convex F-space is a Fréchet space.
- LF-spaces are limits of Fréchet spaces. ILH spaces are inverse limits of Hilbert spaces.
- Nuclear spaces: these are locally convex spaces with the property that every bounded map from the nuclear space to an arbitrary Banach space is a nuclear operator.
- Normed spaces and seminormed spaces: locally convex spaces where the topology can be described by a single norm or seminorm. In normed spaces a linear operator is continuous if and only if it is bounded.
- Banach spaces: Complete normed vector spaces. Most of functional analysis is formulated for Banach spaces. This class includes the $L^p$ spaces with $1\leq p \leq \infty,$ the space $BV$ of functions of bounded variation, and certain spaces of measures.
- Reflexive Banach spaces: Banach spaces naturally isomorphic to their double dual (see below), which ensures that some geometrical arguments can be carried out. An important example which is not reflexive is $L^1$, whose dual is $L^{\infty}$ but is strictly contained in the dual of $L^{\infty}.$
- Hilbert spaces: these have an inner product; even though these spaces may be infinite-dimensional, most geometrical reasoning familiar from finite dimensions can be carried out in them. These include $L^2$ spaces, the $L^2$ Sobolev spaces $W^{2,k},$ and Hardy spaces.
- Euclidean spaces: $\R^n$ or $\Complex^n$ with the topology induced by the standard inner product. As pointed out in the preceding section, for a given finite $n,$ there is only one $n$-dimensional topological vector space, up to isomorphism. It follows from this that any finite-dimensional subspace of a TVS is closed. A characterization of finite dimensionality is that a Hausdorff TVS is locally compact if and only if it is finite-dimensional (therefore isomorphic to some Euclidean space).

== Dual space ==
Every topological vector space has a continuous dual space—the set $X'$ of all continuous linear functionals, that is, continuous linear maps from the space into the base field $\mathbb{K}.$ A topology on the dual can be defined to be the coarsest topology such that the dual pairing each point evaluation $X' \to \mathbb{K}$ is continuous. This turns the dual into a locally convex topological vector space. This topology is called the weak-* topology. This may not be the only natural topology on the dual space; for instance, the dual of a normed space has a natural norm defined on it. However, it is very important in applications because of its compactness properties (see Banach–Alaoglu theorem). Caution: Whenever $X$ is a non-normable locally convex space, then the pairing map $X' \times X \to \mathbb{K}$ is never continuous, no matter which vector space topology one chooses on $X'.$ A topological vector space has a non-trivial continuous dual space if and only if it has a proper convex neighborhood of the origin.

== Properties ==
For any $S \subseteq X$ of a TVS $X,$ the convex (resp. balanced, disked, closed convex, closed balanced, closed disked') hull of $S$ is the smallest subset of $X$ that has this property and contains $S.$ The closure (respectively, interior, convex hull, balanced hull, disked hull) of a set $S$ is sometimes denoted by $\operatorname{cl}_X S$ (respectively, $\operatorname{Int}_X S,$ $\operatorname{co} S,$ $\operatorname{bal} S,$ $\operatorname{cobal} S$).

The convex hull $\operatorname{co} S$ of a subset $S$ is equal to the set of all convex combinations of elements in $S,$ which are finite linear combinations of the form $t_1 s_1 + \cdots + t_n s_n$ where $n \geq 1$ is an integer, $s_1, \ldots, s_n \in S$ and $t_1, \ldots, t_n \in [0, 1]$ sum to $1.$ The intersection of any family of convex sets is convex and the convex hull of a subset is equal to the intersection of all convex sets that contain it.

=== Neighborhoods and open sets ===
Properties of neighborhoods and open sets

Every TVS is connected and locally connected and any connected open subset of a TVS is arcwise connected. If $S \subseteq X$ and $U$ is an open subset of $X$ then $S + U$ is an open set in $X$ and if $S \subseteq X$ has non-empty interior then $S - S$ is a neighborhood of the origin.

The open convex subsets of a TVS $X$ (not necessarily Hausdorff or locally convex) are exactly those that are of the form
$$z + \{x \in X : p(x) < 1\} ~=~ \{x \in X : p(x - z) < 1\}$$
for some $z \in X$ and some positive continuous sublinear functional $p$ on $X.$

If $K$ is an absorbing disk in a TVS $X$ and if $p := p_K$ is the Minkowski functional of $K$ then
$$\operatorname{Int}_X K ~\subseteq~ \{x \in X : p(x) < 1\} ~\subseteq~ K ~\subseteq~ \{x \in X : p(x) \leq 1\} ~\subseteq~ \operatorname{cl}_X K$$
where importantly, it was not assumed that $K$ had any topological properties nor that $p$ was continuous (which happens if and only if $K$ is a neighborhood of the origin).

Let $\tau$ and $\nu$ be two vector topologies on $X.$ Then $\tau \subseteq \nu$ if and only if whenever a net $x_{\bull} = \left(x_i\right)_{i \in I}$ in $X$ converges $0$ in $(X, \nu)$ then $x_{\bull} \to 0$ in $(X, \tau).$

Let $\mathcal{N}$ be a neighborhood basis of the origin in $X,$ let $S \subseteq X,$ and let $x \in X.$ Then $x \in \operatorname{cl}_X S$ if and only if there exists a net $s_{\bull} = \left(s_N\right)_{N \in \mathcal{N}}$ in $S$ (indexed by $\mathcal{N}$) such that $s_{\bull} \to x$ in $X.$ This shows, in particular, that it will often suffice to consider nets indexed by a neighborhood basis of the origin rather than nets on arbitrary directed sets.

If $X$ is a TVS that is of the second category in itself (that is, a nonmeager space) then any closed convex absorbing subset of $X$ is a neighborhood of the origin. This is no longer guaranteed if the set is not convex (a counter-example exists even in $X = \R^2$) or if $X$ is not of the second category in itself.

Interior

If $R, S \subseteq X$ and $S$ has non-empty interior then
$$\operatorname{Int}_X S ~=~ \operatorname{Int}_X \left(\operatorname{cl}_X S\right)~ \text{ and } ~\operatorname{cl}_X S ~=~ \operatorname{cl}_X \left(\operatorname{Int}_X S\right)$$
and
$$\operatorname{Int}_X (R) + \operatorname{Int}_X (S) ~\subseteq~ R + \operatorname{Int}_X S \subseteq \operatorname{Int}_X (R + S).$$

The topological interior of a disk is not empty if and only if this interior contains the origin. More generally, if $S$ is a balanced set with non-empty interior $\operatorname{Int}_X S \neq \varnothing$ in a TVS $X$ then $\{0\} \cup \operatorname{Int}_X S$ will necessarily be balanced; consequently, $\operatorname{Int}_X S$ will be balanced if and only if it contains the origin. (Note: This is because every non-empty balanced set must contain the origin and because $0 \in \operatorname{Int}_X S$ if and only if $\operatorname{Int}_X S = \{0\} \cup \operatorname{Int}_X S.$) For this (i.e. $0 \in \operatorname{Int}_X S$) to be true, it suffices for $S$ to also be convex (in addition to being balanced and having non-empty interior).; The conclusion $0 \in \operatorname{Int}_X S$ could be false if $S$ is not also convex; for example, in $X := \R^2,$ the interior of the closed and balanced set $S := \{(x, y) : x y \geq 0\}$ is $\{(x, y) : x y > 0\}.$

If $C$ is convex and $0 < t \leq 1,$ then $t \operatorname{Int} C + (1 - t) \operatorname{cl} C ~\subseteq~ \operatorname{Int} C.$ Explicitly, this means that if $C$ is a convex subset of a TVS $X$ (not necessarily Hausdorff or locally convex), $y \in \operatorname{int}_X C,$ and $x \in \operatorname{cl}_X C$ then the open line segment joining $x$ and $y$ belongs to the interior of $C;$ that is, $\{t x + (1 - t) y : 0 < t < 1\} \subseteq \operatorname{int}_X C.$ (Note: Fix $0 < r < 1$ so it remains to show that $w_0 ~\stackrel{\scriptscriptstyle\text{def}}{=}~ r x + (1 - r) y$ belongs to $\operatorname{int}_X C.$ By replacing $C, x, y$ with $C - w_0, x - w_0, y - w_0$ if necessary, we may assume without loss of generality that $r x + (1 - r) y = 0,$ and so it remains to show that $C$ is a neighborhood of the origin. Let $s ~\stackrel{\scriptscriptstyle\text{def}}{=}~ \tfrac{r}{r - 1} < 0$ so that $y = \tfrac{r}{r - 1} x = s x.$ Since scalar multiplication by $s \neq 0$ is a linear homeomorphism $X \to X,$ $\operatorname{cl}_X \left(\tfrac{1}{s} C\right) = \tfrac{1}{s} \operatorname{cl}_X C.$ Since $x \in \operatorname{int} C$ and $y \in \operatorname{cl} C,$ it follows that $x = \tfrac{1}{s} y \in \operatorname{cl} \left(\tfrac{1}{s} C\right) \cap \operatorname{int} C$ where because $\operatorname{int} C$ is open, there exists some $c_0 \in \left(\tfrac{1}{s} C\right) \cap \operatorname{int} C,$ which satisfies $s c_0 \in C.$ Define $h : X \to X$ by $x \mapsto r x + (1 - r) s c_0 = r x - r c_0,$ which is a homeomorphism because $0 < r < 1.$ The set $h\left(\operatorname{int} C\right)$ is thus an open subset of $X$ that moreover contains $h(c_0) = r c_0 - r c_0 = 0.$ If $c \in \operatorname{int} C$ then $h(c) = r c + (1 - r) s c_0 \in C$ since $C$ is convex, $0 < r < 1,$ and $s c_0, c \in C,$ which proves that $h\left(\operatorname{int} C\right) \subseteq C.$ Thus $h\left(\operatorname{int} C\right)$ is an open subset of $X$ that contains the origin and is contained in $C.$ Q.E.D.)

If $N \subseteq X$ is any balanced neighborhood of the origin in $X$ then $\operatorname{Int}_X N \subseteq B_1 N = \bigcup_{0 < |a| < 1} a N \subseteq N$ where $B_1$ is the set of all scalars $a$ such that $|a| < 1.$

If $x$ belongs to the interior of a convex set $S \subseteq X$ and $y \in \operatorname{cl}_X S,$ then the half-open line segment
$$[x, y) := \{t x + (1 - t) y : 0 < t \leq 1\} \subseteq \operatorname{Int}_X \text{ if } x \neq y$$
and
$$[x, x) = \varnothing \text{ if } x = y.$$
If $N$ is a balanced neighborhood of $0$ in $X$ and $B_1 := \{a \in \mathbb{K} : |a| < 1\},$ then by considering intersections of the form $N \cap \R x$ (which are convex symmetric neighborhoods of $0$ in the real TVS $\R x$) it follows that: $\operatorname{Int} N = [0, 1) \operatorname{Int} N = (-1, 1) N = B_1 N,$ and furthermore, if $x \in \operatorname{Int} N \text{ and } r := \sup \{r > 0 : [0, r) x \subseteq N\}$ then $r > 1 \text{ and } [0, r) x \subseteq \operatorname{Int} N,$ and if $r \neq \infty$ then $r x \in \operatorname{cl} N \setminus \operatorname{Int} N.$

=== Non-Hausdorff spaces and the closure of the origin ===
A topological vector space $X$ is Hausdorff if and only if $\{0\}$ is a closed subset of $X,$ or equivalently, if and only if $\{0\} = \operatorname{cl}_X \{0\}.$ Because $\{0\}$ is a vector subspace of $X,$ the same is true of its closure $\operatorname{cl}_X \{0\},$ which is referred to as the closure of the origin in $X.$ This vector space satisfies
$$\operatorname{cl}_X \{0\} = \bigcap_{N \in \mathcal{N}(0)} N$$
so that in particular, every neighborhood of the origin in $X$ contains the vector space $\operatorname{cl}_X \{0\}$ as a subset. The subspace topology on $\operatorname{cl}_X \{0\}$ is always the trivial topology, which in particular implies that the topological vector space $\operatorname{cl}_X \{0\}$ a compact space (even if its dimension is non-zero or even infinite) and consequently also a bounded subset of $X.$ In fact, a vector subspace of a TVS is bounded if and only if it is contained in the closure of $\{0\}.$ Every subset of $\operatorname{cl}_X \{0\}$ also carries the trivial topology and so is itself a compact, and thus also complete, subspace (see footnote for a proof). (Note: Since $\operatorname{cl}_X \{0\}$ has the trivial topology, so does each of its subsets, which makes them all compact. It is known that a subset of any uniform space is compact if and only if it is complete and totally bounded.) In particular, if $X$ is not Hausdorff then there exist subsets that are both compact and complete but not closed in $X$; for instance, this will be true of any non-empty proper subset of $\operatorname{cl}_X \{0\}.$

If $S \subseteq X$ is compact, then $\operatorname{cl}_X S = S + \operatorname{cl}_X \{0\}$ and this set is compact. Thus the closure of a compact subset of a TVS is compact (said differently, all compact sets are relatively compact), which is not guaranteed for arbitrary non-Hausdorff topological spaces. (Note: In general topology, the closure of a compact subset of a non-Hausdorff space may fail to be compact (for example, the particular point topology on an infinite set). This result shows that this does not happen in non-Hausdorff TVSs. $S + \operatorname{cl}_X \{0\}$ is compact because it is the image of the compact set $S \times \operatorname{cl}_X \{0\}$ under the continuous addition map $\cdot\, + \,\cdot\; : X \times X \to X.$ Recall also that the sum of a compact set (that is, $S$) and a closed set is closed so $S + \operatorname{cl}_X \{0\}$ is closed in $X.$)

For every subset $S \subseteq X,$
$$S + \operatorname{cl}_X \{0\} \subseteq \operatorname{cl}_X S$$
and consequently, if $S \subseteq X$ is open or closed in $X$ then $S + \operatorname{cl}_X \{0\} = S$ (Note: If $s \in S$ then $s + \operatorname{cl}_X \{0\} = \operatorname{cl}_X (s + \{0\}) = \operatorname{cl}_X \{s\} \subseteq \operatorname{cl}_X S.$ Because $S \subseteq S + \operatorname{cl}_X \{0\} \subseteq \operatorname{cl}_X S,$ if $S$ is closed then equality holds. Using the fact that $\operatorname{cl}_X \{0\}$ is a vector space, it is readily verified that the complement in $X$ of any set $S$ satisfying the equality $S + \operatorname{cl}_X \{0\} = S$ must also satisfy this equality (when $X \setminus S$ is substituted for $S$).) (so that this arbitrary open or closed subsets $S$ can be described as a "tube" whose vertical side is the vector space $\operatorname{cl}_X \{0\}$). For any subset $S \subseteq X$ of this TVS $X,$ the following are equivalent:

- $S$ is totally bounded.
- $S + \operatorname{cl}_X \{0\}$ is totally bounded.
- $\operatorname{cl}_X S$ is totally bounded.
- The image if $S$ under the canonical quotient map $X \to X / \operatorname{cl}_X (\{0\})$ is totally bounded.

If $M$ is a vector subspace of a TVS $X$ then $X / M$ is Hausdorff if and only if $M$ is closed in $X.$ Moreover, the quotient map $q : X \to X / \operatorname{cl}_X \{0\}$ is always a closed map onto the (necessarily) Hausdorff TVS.

Every vector subspace of $X$ that is an algebraic complement of $\operatorname{cl}_X \{0\}$ (that is, a vector subspace $H$ that satisfies $\{0\} = H \cap \operatorname{cl}_X \{0\}$ and $X = H + \operatorname{cl}_X \{0\}$) is a topological complement of $\operatorname{cl}_X \{0\}.$ Consequently, if $H$ is an algebraic complement of $\operatorname{cl}_X \{0\}$ in $X$ then the addition map $H \times \operatorname{cl}_X \{0\} \to X,$ defined by $(h, n) \mapsto h + n$ is a TVS-isomorphism, where $H$ is necessarily Hausdorff and $\operatorname{cl}_X \{0\}$ has the indiscrete topology. Moreover, if $C$ is a Hausdorff completion of $H$ then $C \times \operatorname{cl}_X \{0\}$ is a completion of $X \cong H \times \operatorname{cl}_X \{0\}.$

=== Closed and compact sets ===
Compact and totally bounded sets

A subset of a TVS is compact if and only if it is complete and totally bounded. Thus, in a complete topological vector space, a closed and totally bounded subset is compact. A subset $S$ of a TVS $X$ is totally bounded if and only if $\operatorname{cl}_X S$ is totally bounded, if and only if its image under the canonical quotient map
$$X \to X / \operatorname{cl}_X (\{0\})$$
is totally bounded.

Every relatively compact set is totally bounded and the closure of a totally bounded set is totally bounded. The image of a totally bounded set under a uniformly continuous map (such as a continuous linear map for instance) is totally bounded. If $S$ is a subset of a TVS $X$ such that every sequence in $S$ has a cluster point in $S$ then $S$ is totally bounded.

If $K$ is a compact subset of a TVS $X$ and $U$ is an open subset of $X$ containing $K,$ then there exists a neighborhood $N$ of 0 such that $K + N \subseteq U.$

Closure and closed set

The closure of any convex (respectively, any balanced, any absorbing) subset of any TVS has this same property. In particular, the closure of any convex, balanced, and absorbing subset is a barrel.

The closure of a vector subspace of a TVS is a vector subspace. Every finite dimensional vector subspace of a Hausdorff TVS is closed. The sum of a closed vector subspace and a finite-dimensional vector subspace is closed. If $M$ is a vector subspace of $X$ and $N$ is a closed neighborhood of the origin in $X$ such that $U \cap N$ is closed in $X$ then $M$ is closed in $X.$ The sum of a compact set and a closed set is closed. However, the sum of two closed subsets may fail to be closed (see this footnote (Note: In $\R^2,$ the sum of the $y$-axis and the graph of $y = \frac{1}{x},$ which is the complement of the $y$-axis, is open in $\R^2.$ In $\R,$ the Minkowski sum $\Z + \sqrt{2}\Z$ is a countable dense subset of $\R$ so not closed in $\R.$) for examples).

If $S \subseteq X$ and $a$ is a scalar then
$$a \operatorname{cl}_X S \subseteq \operatorname{cl}_X (a S),$$
where if $X$ is Hausdorff, $a \neq 0, \text{ or } S = \varnothing$ then equality holds: $\operatorname{cl}_X (a S) = a \operatorname{cl}_X S.$ In particular, every non-zero scalar multiple of a closed set is closed. If $S \subseteq X$ and if $A$ is a set of scalars such that neither $\operatorname{cl} S \text{ nor } \operatorname{cl} A$ contain zero then $\left(\operatorname{cl} A\right) \left(\operatorname{cl}_X S\right) = \operatorname{cl}_X (A S).$

If $S \subseteq X \text{ and } S + S \subseteq 2 \operatorname{cl}_X S$ then $\operatorname{cl}_X S$ is convex.

If $R, S \subseteq X$ then
$$\operatorname{cl}_X (R) + \operatorname{cl}_X (S) ~\subseteq~ \operatorname{cl}_X (R + S)~ \text{ and } ~\operatorname{cl}_X \left[ \operatorname{cl}_X (R) + \operatorname{cl}_X (S) \right] ~=~ \operatorname{cl}_X (R + S)$$
and so consequently, if $R + S$ is closed then so is $\operatorname{cl}_X (R) + \operatorname{cl}_X (S).$

If $X$ is a real TVS and $S \subseteq X,$ then
$$\bigcap_{r > 1} r S \subseteq \operatorname{cl}_X S$$
where the left hand side is independent of the topology on $X;$ moreover, if $S$ is a convex neighborhood of the origin then equality holds.

For any subset $S \subseteq X,$
$$\operatorname{cl}_X S ~=~ \bigcap_{N \in \mathcal{N}} (S + N)$$
where $\mathcal{N}$ is any neighborhood basis at the origin for $X.$ However,
$$\operatorname{cl}_X U ~\supseteq~ \bigcap \{U : S \subseteq U, U \text{ is open in } X\}$$
and it is possible for this containment to be proper (for example, if $X = \R$ and $S$ is the rational numbers). It follows that $\operatorname{cl}_X U \subseteq U + U$ for every neighborhood $U$ of the origin in $X.$

Closed hulls

In a locally convex space, convex hulls of bounded sets are bounded. This is not true for TVSs in general.

- The closed convex hull of a set is equal to the closure of the convex hull of that set; that is, equal to $\operatorname{cl}_X (\operatorname{co} S).$
- The closed balanced hull of a set is equal to the closure of the balanced hull of that set; that is, equal to $\operatorname{cl}_X (\operatorname{bal} S).$
- The closed disked hull of a set is equal to the closure of the disked hull of that set; that is, equal to $\operatorname{cl}_X (\operatorname{cobal} S).$

If $R, S \subseteq X$ and the closed convex hull of one of the sets $S$ or $R$ is compact then
$$\operatorname{cl}_X (\operatorname{co} (R + S)) ~=~  \operatorname{cl}_X (\operatorname{co} R) + \operatorname{cl}_X (\operatorname{co} S).$$
If $R, S \subseteq X$ each have a closed convex hull that is compact (that is, $\operatorname{cl}_X (\operatorname{co} R)$ and $\operatorname{cl}_X (\operatorname{co} S)$ are compact) then
$$\operatorname{cl}_X (\operatorname{co} (R \cup S)) ~=~ \operatorname{co} \left[ \operatorname{cl}_X (\operatorname{co} R) \cup \operatorname{cl}_X (\operatorname{co} S) \right].$$

Hulls and compactness

In a general TVS, the closed convex hull of a compact set may fail to be compact. The balanced hull of a compact (respectively, totally bounded) set has that same property. The convex hull of a finite union of compact convex sets is again compact and convex.

=== Other properties ===
Meager, nowhere dense, and Baire

A disk in a TVS is not nowhere dense if and only if its closure is a neighborhood of the origin. A vector subspace of a TVS that is closed but not open is nowhere dense.

Suppose $X$ is a TVS that does not carry the indiscrete topology. Then $X$ is a Baire space if and only if $X$ has no balanced absorbing nowhere dense subset.

A TVS $X$ is a Baire space if and only if $X$ is nonmeager, which happens if and only if there does not exist a nowhere dense set $D$ such that $X = \bigcup_{n \in \N} n D.$ Every nonmeager locally convex TVS is a barrelled space.

Important algebraic facts and common misconceptions

If $S \subseteq X$ then $2 S \subseteq S + S$; if $S$ is convex then equality holds. For an example where equality does not hold, let $x$ be non-zero and set $S = \{- x, x\};$ $S = \{x, 2 x\}$ also works.

A subset $C$ is convex if and only if $(s + t) C = s C + t C$ for all positive real $s > 0 \text{ and } t > 0,$ or equivalently, if and only if $t C + (1 - t) C \subseteq C$ for all $0 \leq t \leq 1.$

The convex balanced hull of a set $S \subseteq X$ is equal to the convex hull of the balanced hull of $S;$ that is, it is equal to $\operatorname{co} (\operatorname{bal} S).$ But in general,
$$\operatorname{bal} (\operatorname{co} S) ~\subseteq~ \operatorname{cobal} S ~=~ \operatorname{co} (\operatorname{bal} S),$$
where the inclusion might be strict since the balanced hull of a convex set need not be convex (counter-examples exist even in $\R^2$).

If $R, S \subseteq X$ and $a$ is a scalar then
$$a(R + S) = aR + a S,~ \text{ and } ~\operatorname{co} (R + S) = \operatorname{co} R + \operatorname{co} S,~ \text{ and } ~\operatorname{co} (a S) = a \operatorname{co} S.$$
If $R, S \subseteq X$ are convex non-empty disjoint sets and $x \not\in R \cup S,$ then $S \cap \operatorname{co} (R \cup \{x\}) = \varnothing$ or $R \cap \operatorname{co} (S \cup \{x\}) = \varnothing.$

In any non-trivial vector space $X,$ there exist two disjoint non-empty convex subsets whose union is $X.$

Other properties

Every TVS topology can be generated by a family of F-seminorms.

If $P(x)$ is some unary predicate (a true or false statement dependent on $x \in X$) then for any $z \in X,$ $z + \{x \in X : P(x)\} = \{x \in X : P(x - z)\}.$ (Note: $$z + \{x \in X : P(x)\} = \{z + x : x \in X, P(x)\} = \{z + x : x \in X, P((z + x) - z)\}$$ and so using $y = z + x$ and the fact that $z + X = X,$ this is equal to $$\{y : y - z \in X, P(y - z)\} = \{y : y \in X, P(y - z)\} = \{y \in X : P(y - z)\}.$$ Q.E.D. $\blacksquare$) So for example, if $P(x)$ denotes "$\|x\| < 1$" then for any $z \in X,$ $z + \{x \in X : \|x\| < 1\} = \{x \in X : \|x - z\| < 1\}.$ Similarly, if $s \neq 0$ is a scalar then $s \{x \in X : P(x)\} = \left\{x \in X : P\left(\tfrac{1}{s} x\right)\right\}.$ The elements $x \in X$ of these sets must range over a vector space (that is, over $X$) rather than not just a subset or else these equalities are no longer guaranteed; similarly, $z$ must belong to this vector space (that is, $z \in X$).

=== Properties preserved by set operators ===
- The balanced hull of a compact (respectively, totally bounded, open) set has that same property.
- The (Minkowski) sum of two compact (respectively, bounded, balanced, convex) sets has that same property. But the sum of two closed sets need not be closed.
- The convex hull of a balanced (resp. open) set is balanced (respectively, open). However, the convex hull of a closed set need not be closed. And the convex hull of a bounded set need not be bounded.

The following table, the color of each cell indicates whether or not a given property of subsets of $X$ (indicated by the column name, "convex" for instance) is preserved under the set operator (indicated by the row's name, "closure" for instance). If in every TVS, a property is preserved under the indicated set operator then that cell will be colored green; otherwise, it will be colored red.

So for instance, since the union of two absorbing sets is again absorbing, the cell in row "$R \cup S$" and column "Absorbing" is colored green. But since the arbitrary intersection of absorbing sets need not be absorbing, the cell in row "Arbitrary intersections (of at least 1 set)" and column "Absorbing" is colored red. If a cell is not colored then that information has yet to be filled in.

Properties preserved by set operators
Operation	Property of $R,$ $S,$ and any other subsets of $X$ that is considered																												
Operation	Absorbing	Balanced	Convex	Symmetric	Convex Balanced	Vector subspace	Open	Neighborhood of 0	Closed	Closed Balanced	Closed Convex	Closed Convex Balanced	Barrel	Closed Vector subspace	Totally bounded	Compact	Compact Convex	Relatively compact	Complete	Sequentially Complete	Banach disk	Bounded	Bornivorous	Infrabornivorous	Nowhere dense (in $X$)	Meager	Separable	Pseudometrizable	Operation
$R \cup S$	Yes	Yes	No	Yes	No	No	Yes	Yes	Yes	Yes	No	No		No	Yes	Yes	No	Yes		Yes		Yes	Yes	Yes	Yes	Yes	Yes	Yes	$R \cup S$
$\cup$ of increasing nonempty chain	Yes	Yes	Yes	Yes	Yes	Yes	Yes	Yes	No	No	No	No	No	No	No	No	No	No	No	No		No	Yes	Yes	No	No			$\cup$ of increasing nonempty chain
Arbitrary unions (of at least 1 set)	Yes	Yes	No	Yes	No	No	Yes	Yes	No	No	No	No	No	No	No	No	No	No	No	No		No	Yes	Yes	No	No			Arbitrary unions (of at least 1 set)
$R \cap S$	Yes	Yes	Yes	Yes	Yes	Yes	Yes	Yes	Yes	Yes	Yes	Yes	Yes	Yes	Yes	Yes	Yes			Yes		Yes			Yes	Yes		Yes	$R \cap S$
$\cap$ of decreasing nonempty chain	No	Yes	Yes	Yes	Yes	Yes	No	No	Yes	Yes	Yes	Yes	No	Yes	Yes							Yes			Yes			Yes	$\cap$ of decreasing nonempty chain
Arbitrary intersections (of at least 1 set)	No	Yes	Yes	Yes	Yes	No	Yes	No	Yes	Yes	Yes	Yes	No	Yes	Yes							Yes			Yes			Yes	Arbitrary intersections (of at least 1 set)
$R + S$	Yes	Yes	Yes	Yes	Yes	Yes	Yes	Yes	No		No					Yes	Yes					Yes							$R + S$
Scalar multiple	No	Yes	Yes	Yes	Yes	Yes	No	No	No	No	No	No	No	No	Yes	Yes	Yes	Yes	Yes	Yes		Yes	No	No	Yes	Yes	Yes	Yes	Scalar multiple
Non-0 scalar multiple	Yes	Yes	Yes	Yes	Yes	Yes	Yes	Yes	Yes	Yes	Yes	Yes	Yes	Yes	Yes	Yes	Yes	Yes	Yes	Yes	Yes	Yes	Yes	Yes	Yes	Yes	Yes	Yes	Non-0 scalar multiple
Positive scalar multiple	Yes	Yes	Yes	Yes	Yes	Yes	Yes	Yes	Yes	Yes	Yes	Yes	Yes	Yes	Yes	Yes	Yes		Yes	Yes		Yes	Yes	Yes	Yes	Yes	Yes	Yes	Positive scalar multiple
Closure	Yes	Yes	Yes	Yes	Yes	Yes	No	Yes	Yes	Yes	Yes	Yes	Yes	Yes	Yes	Yes	Yes	Yes				Yes	Yes	Yes	Yes				Closure
Interior	No	No	Yes	Yes		No	Yes	Yes	No	No	No	No	No	No		No	No					Yes			Yes	No			Interior
Balanced core	Yes	Yes	Yes	Yes	Yes	Yes	Yes	Yes	Yes	Yes	Yes	Yes	Yes	Yes	Yes							Yes			Yes	Yes			Balanced core
Balanced hull	Yes	Yes	No	Yes	Yes	Yes	Yes	Yes	No	Yes		Yes	Yes	Yes	Yes	Yes	No				Yes	Yes	Yes	Yes	No	No			Balanced hull
Convex hull	Yes	Yes	Yes	Yes	Yes	Yes	Yes	Yes	No		Yes	Yes	Yes	Yes			Yes				Yes	No	Yes	Yes	No	No			Convex hull
Convex balanced hull	Yes	Yes	Yes	Yes	Yes	Yes	Yes	Yes	Yes	Yes		Yes	Yes	Yes							Yes	No	Yes	Yes	No	No			Convex balanced hull
Closed balanced hull	Yes	Yes	No	Yes	Yes	Yes	No	Yes	Yes	Yes	Yes	Yes	Yes	Yes								Yes	Yes	Yes	No	No			Closed balanced hull
Closed convex hull	Yes	Yes	Yes	Yes	Yes	Yes	No	Yes	Yes	Yes	Yes	Yes	Yes	Yes								No	Yes	Yes	No	No			Closed convex hull
Closed convex balanced hull	Yes	Yes	Yes	Yes	Yes	Yes	No	Yes	Yes	Yes	Yes	Yes	Yes	Yes								No	Yes	Yes	No	No			Closed convex balanced hull
Linear span	Yes	Yes	Yes	Yes	Yes	Yes	Yes	Yes					Yes	Yes	No	No	No	No			Yes	No	Yes	Yes	No	No			Linear span
Pre-image under a continuous linear map	Yes	Yes	Yes	Yes	Yes	Yes	Yes	Yes	Yes	Yes	Yes	Yes	Yes	Yes	No	No	No	No				No					No	No	Pre-image under a continuous linear map
Image under a continuous linear map	No	Yes	Yes	Yes	Yes	Yes	No	No	No	No	No	No	No	No	Yes	Yes	Yes					Yes			No		Yes		Image under a continuous linear map
Image under a continuous linear surjection	Yes	Yes	Yes	Yes	Yes	Yes									Yes	Yes	Yes					Yes			No		Yes		Image under a continuous linear surjection
Non-empty subset of $R$	No	No	No	No	No	No	No	No	No	No	No	No	No	No	Yes	No	No		No	No		Yes	No	No	Yes	Yes		Yes	Non-empty subset of $R$
Operation	Absorbing	Balanced	Convex	Symmetric	Convex Balanced	Vector subspace	Open	Neighborhood of 0	Closed	Closed Balanced	Closed Convex	Closed Convex Balanced	Barrel	Closed Vector subspace	Totally bounded	Compact	Compact Convex	Relatively compact	Complete	Sequentially Complete	Banach disk	Bounded	Bornivorous	Infrabornivorous	Nowhere dense (in $X$)	Meager	Separable	Pseudometrizable	Operation

== See also ==
- Banach space – Normed vector space that is complete
- Complete field
- Hilbert space – Type of vector space in math
- Liquid vector space – Area of mathematics using condensed sets
- Normed space – Vector space on which a distance is defined
- Locally compact field
- Locally compact group – Type of topological group in mathematics
- Locally compact quantum group
- Locally convex topological vector space – Space with topology generated by convex sets
- Ordered topological vector space
- Topological abelian group
- Topological field – Algebraic structure with addition, multiplication, and division
- Topological group – Group that is a topological space with continuous group operations
- Topological module
- Topological ring
- Topological semigroup
- Topological vector lattice
- Measure theory in topological vector spaces – Subject in mathematics

== Bibliography ==
- Adasch, Norbert; Ernst, Bruno; Keim, Dieter (1978). Topological Vector Spaces: The Theory Without Convexity Conditions. Lecture Notes in Mathematics. Vol. 639. Berlin New York: Springer-Verlag. ISBN 978-3-540-08662-8. OCLC 297140003.
- Jarchow, Hans (1981). Locally convex spaces. Stuttgart: B.G. Teubner. ISBN 978-3-519-02224-4. OCLC 8210342.
- Köthe, Gottfried (1983) [1969]. Topological Vector Spaces I. Grundlehren der mathematischen Wissenschaften. Vol. 159. Translated by Garling, D.J.H. New York: Springer Science & Business Media. ISBN 978-3-642-64988-2. MR 0248498. OCLC 840293704.
- Narici, Lawrence; Beckenstein, Edward (2011). Topological Vector Spaces. Pure and applied mathematics (Second ed.). Boca Raton, FL: CRC Press. ISBN 978-1584888666. OCLC 144216834.
- Rudin, Walter (1991). Functional Analysis. International Series in Pure and Applied Mathematics. Vol. 8 (Second ed.). New York, NY: McGraw-Hill Science/Engineering/Math. ISBN 978-0-07-054236-5. OCLC 21163277.
- Schaefer, Helmut H.; Wolff, Manfred P. (1999). Topological Vector Spaces. GTM. Vol. 8 (Second ed.). New York, NY: Springer New York Imprint Springer. ISBN 978-1-4612-7155-0. OCLC 840278135.
- Schechter, Eric (1996). Handbook of Analysis and Its Foundations. San Diego, CA: Academic Press. ISBN 978-0-12-622760-4. OCLC 175294365.
- Swartz, Charles (1992). An introduction to Functional Analysis. New York: M. Dekker. ISBN 978-0-8247-8643-4. OCLC 24909067.
- Wilansky, Albert (2013). Modern Methods in Topological Vector Spaces. Mineola, New York: Dover Publications, Inc. ISBN 978-0-486-49353-4. OCLC 849801114.
