= Zariski ring =

In commutative algebra, a Zariski ring is a commutative Noetherian topological ring A whose topology is defined by an ideal $\mathfrak a$ contained in the Jacobson radical, the intersection of all maximal ideals. They were introduced by Oscar Zariski (1946) under the name "semi-local ring" which now means something different, and named "Zariski rings" by Pierre Samuel (1953). Examples of Zariski rings are noetherian local rings with the topology induced by the maximal ideal, and $\mathfrak a$-adic completions of Noetherian rings.

Let A be a Noetherian topological ring with the topology defined by an ideal $\mathfrak a$. Then the following are equivalent.

- A is a Zariski ring.
- The completion $\widehat{A}$ is faithfully flat over A (in general, it is only flat over A).
- Every maximal ideal is closed.
