= Topological semigroup =

In mathematics, a topological semigroup is a semigroup that is simultaneously a topological space, and whose semigroup operation is continuous.

Every topological group is a topological semigroup.

== See also ==
- Analytic semigroup – Type of strongly continuous semigroup
- Compact group – Topological group with compact topology
- Complete field – algebraic structure that is complete relative to a metric
- Ellis–Numakura lemma – A compact topological semigroup with a semicontinuous product has an idempotent element
- Locally compact group – topological group for which the underlying topology is locally compact and Hausdorff, so that the Haar measure can be defined
- Locally compact quantum group – relatively new C*-algebraic approach toward quantum groups
- Ordered topological vector space
- Strongly continuous semigroup – Generalization of the exponential function
- Topological abelian group – topological group whose group is abelian
- Topological field – Algebraic structure with addition, multiplication, and division
- Topological group – Group that is a topological space with continuous group action
- Topological module
- Topological ring – ring where ring operations are continuous
- Topological vector lattice
- Topological vector space – Vector space with a notion of nearness
