= I-adic topology =

Concept in commutative algebra

In commutative algebra, the mathematical study of commutative rings, adic topologies are a family of topologies on the underlying set of a module, generalizing the p-adic topologies on the integers.

== Definition ==
Let R be a commutative ring and M an R-module. Then each ideal 𝔞 of R determines a topology on M called the 𝔞-adic topology, characterized by the pseudometric
$$d(x,y) = 2^{-\sup{\{n \mid x-y\in\mathfrak{a}^nM\}}}.$$
The family
$$\{x+\mathfrak{a}^nM:x\in M,n\in\mathbb{Z}^+\}$$
is a basis for this topology.

An 𝔞-adic topology is a linear topology (a topology generated by some submodules).

== Properties ==
With respect to the topology, the module operations of addition and scalar multiplication are continuous, so that M becomes a topological module. However, M need not be Hausdorff; it is Hausdorff if and only if
$$\bigcap_{n > 0}{\mathfrak{a}^nM} = 0\text{,}$$
so that d becomes a genuine metric. Related to the usual terminology in topology, where a Hausdorff space is also called separated, in that case, the 𝔞-adic topology is called separated.

By Krull's intersection theorem, if R is a Noetherian ring which is an integral domain or a local ring, it holds that $\bigcap_{n > 0}{\mathfrak{a}^n} = 0$ for any proper ideal 𝔞 of R. Thus under these conditions, for any proper ideal 𝔞 of R and any R-module M, the 𝔞-adic topology on M is separated.

For a submodule N of M, the canonical homomorphism to M/N induces a quotient topology which coincides with the 𝔞-adic topology. The analogous result is not necessarily true for the submodule N itself: the subspace topology need not be the 𝔞-adic topology. However, the two topologies coincide when R is Noetherian and M finitely generated. This follows from the Artin–Rees lemma.

== Completion ==
When M is Hausdorff, M can be completed as a metric space; the resulting space is denoted by $\widehat M$ and has the module structure obtained by extending the module operations by continuity. It is also the same as (or canonically isomorphic to):
$$\widehat{M} = \varprojlim M/\mathfrak{a}^n M$$
where the right-hand side is an inverse limit of quotient modules under natural projection.

For example, let $R = k[x_1, \ldots, x_n]$ be a polynomial ring over a field k and 𝔞 = (x_{1}, ..., x_{n}) the (unique) homogeneous maximal ideal. Then $\hat{R} = k[[x_1, \ldots, x_n]]$, the formal power series ring over k in n variables.

== Closed submodules ==
The 𝔞-adic closure of a submodule $N \subseteq M$ is $\overline{N} = \bigcap_{n > 0}{(N + \mathfrak{a}^n M)}\text{.}$ This closure coincides with N whenever R is 𝔞-adically complete and M is finitely generated.

R is called Zariski with respect to 𝔞 if every ideal in R is 𝔞-adically closed. There is a characterization:

R is Zariski with respect to 𝔞 if and only if 𝔞 is contained in the Jacobson radical of R.

In particular a Noetherian local ring is Zariski with respect to the maximal ideal.
