= Topological abelian group =

In mathematics, a topological abelian group, or TAG, is a topological group that is also an abelian group. That is, a TAG is both a group and a topological space, the group operations are continuous, and the group's binary operation is commutative.

The theory of topological groups applies also to TAGs, but more can be done with TAGs. Locally compact TAGs, in particular, are used heavily in harmonic analysis.

== See also ==
- Compact group – Topological group with compact topology
- Complete field
- Fourier transform – Mathematical transform that expresses a function of time as a function of frequency
- Haar measure – Left-invariant (or right-invariant) measure on locally compact topological group
- Locally compact field
- Locally compact quantum group
- Locally compact group
- Pontryagin duality – Duality for locally compact abelian groups
- Protorus – Mathematical object, a topological abelian group that is compact and connected
- Ordered topological vector space
- Topological field – Algebraic structure with addition, multiplication, and division
- Topological group – Group that is a topological space with continuous group action
- Topological module
- Topological ring
- Topological semigroup
- Topological vector space – Vector space with a notion of nearness
