= Artin–Rees lemma =

In mathematics, the Artin–Rees lemma is a basic result about modules over a Noetherian ring, along with results such as the Hilbert basis theorem. It was proved in the 1950s in independent works by the mathematicians Emil Artin and David Rees; a special case was known to Oscar Zariski prior to their work.

An intuitive characterization of the lemma involves the notion that a submodule N of a module M over some ring A with specified ideal I holds a priori two topologies: one induced by the topology on M, and the other when considered with the I-adic topology over A. Then Artin-Rees dictates that these topologies actually coincide, at least when A is Noetherian and M finitely-generated.

One consequence of the lemma is the Krull intersection theorem. The result is also used to prove the exactness property of completion. The lemma also plays a key role in the study of ℓ-adic sheaves.

== Statement ==
Let I be an ideal in a Noetherian ring R; let M be a finitely generated R-module and let N a submodule of M. Then there exists an integer k ≥ 1 so that, for n ≥ k,

$$I^{n} M \cap N = I^{n - k} (I^{k} M \cap N).$$

== Proof ==
The lemma immediately follows from the fact that R is Noetherian once necessary notions and notations are set up.

For any ring R and an ideal I in R, we set $B_I R = \bigoplus_{n=0}^\infty I^n$ (B for blow-up.) We say a decreasing sequence of submodules $M = M_0 \supset M_1 \supset M_2 \supset \cdots$ is an I-filtration if $I M_n \subset M_{n+1}$; moreover, it is stable if $I M_n = M_{n+1}$ for sufficiently large n. If M is given an I-filtration, we set $B_I M = \bigoplus_{n=0}^\infty M_n$; it is a graded module over $B_I R$.

Now, let M be a R-module with the I-filtration $M_i$ by finitely generated R-modules. We make an observation

$B_I M$ is a finitely generated module over $B_I R$ if and only if the filtration is I-stable.

Indeed, if the filtration is I-stable, then $B_I M$ is generated by the first $k+1$ terms $M_0, \dots, M_k$ and those terms are finitely generated; thus, $B_I M$ is finitely generated. Conversely, if it is finitely generated, then it is generated by $\bigoplus_{j=0}^k M_j$ for some $k \ge 0$. Then, for $n > k$, each f in $M_n$ can be written as
$$f = \sum a_{j} g_{j}, \quad a_{j} \in I^{n-j}$$
with $g_{j}$ in $M_j, j \le k$. That is, $f \in I^{n-k} M_k$.

We can now prove the lemma, assuming R is Noetherian. Let $M_n = I^n M$. Then $M_n$ are an I-stable filtration. Thus, by the observation, $B_I M$ is finitely generated over $B_I R$. But $B_I R \simeq R[It]$ is a Noetherian ring since R is. (The ring $R[It]$ is called the Rees algebra.) Thus, $B_I M$ is a Noetherian module and any submodule is finitely generated over $B_I R$; in particular, $B_I N$ is finitely generated when N is given the induced filtration; i.e., $N_n = M_n \cap N$. Then the induced filtration is I-stable again by the observation.

== Krull's intersection theorem ==
Besides the use in completion of a ring, a typical application of the lemma is the proof of the Krull's intersection theorem, which says: $\bigcap_{n=1}^\infty I^n = 0$ for a proper ideal I in a commutative Noetherian ring that is either a local ring or an integral domain. By the lemma applied to the intersection $N$, we find k such that for $n \ge k$,
$$I^{n} \cap N = I^{n - k} (I^{k} \cap N).$$
Taking $n = k+1$, this means $I^{k+1}\cap N = I(I^{k}\cap N)$ or $N = IN$. Thus, if A is local, $N = 0$ by Nakayama's lemma. If A is an integral domain, then one uses the determinant trick (that is, a variant of the Cayley–Hamilton theorem that yields Nakayama's lemma):

Theorem—Let u be an endomorphism of an A-module N generated by n elements and I an ideal of A such that $u(N) \subset IN$. Then there is a relation:
$$u^n + a_1 u^{n-1} + \cdots  + a_{n-1} u + a_n = 0, \, a_i \in I^i.$$

In the setup here, take u to be the identity operator on N; that will yield a nonzero element x in A such that $x N = 0$, which implies $N = 0$, as $x$ is a nonzerodivisor.

For both a local ring and an integral domain, the "Noetherian" cannot be dropped from the assumption: for the local ring case, see local ring#Commutative case. For the integral domain case, take $A$ to be the ring of algebraic integers (i.e., the integral closure of $\mathbb{Z}$ in $\mathbb{C}$). If $\mathfrak p$ is a prime ideal of A, then we have: $\mathfrak{p}^n = \mathfrak{p}$ for every integer $n > 0$. Indeed, if $y \in \mathfrak p$, then $y = \alpha^n$ for some complex number $\alpha$. Now, $\alpha$ is integral over $\mathbb{Z}$; thus in $A$ and then in $\mathfrak{p}$, proving the claim.

Both the cases of the Noetherian ring being local and the Noetherian ring being an integral domain are consequences of a more general version of Krull's intersection theorem, which is also a consequence of the Artin–Rees and Nakayama lemmata:

Theorem (Krull Intersection)—Let I be an ideal of commutative Noetherian ring A and M be a finitely generated A-module. Set $N:=\textstyle\bigcap_{n=1}^{\infty} I^n M.$ Then there exists $x\in 1+I$ such that x annihilates N.
