= Topological ring =

In mathematics, a topological ring is a ring $R$ that is also a topological space such that both the addition and the multiplication are continuous as maps $R \times R \to R$ where $R \times R$ carries the product topology. This means $R$ is an additive topological group and a multiplicative topological semigroup.

Topological rings are fundamentally related to topological fields and arise naturally while studying them, since for example the completion of a topological field may be a topological ring which is not a field.

== General comments ==
The group of units $R^\times$ of a topological ring $R$ is a topological group when endowed with the topology coming from the embedding of $R^\times$ into the product $R \times R$ as $\left(x, x^{-1}\right).$ However, if the unit group is endowed with the subspace topology as a subspace of $R,$ it may not be a topological group, because inversion on $R^\times$ need not be continuous with respect to the subspace topology. An example of this situation is the adele ring of a global field; its unit group, called the idele group, is not a topological group in the subspace topology. If inversion on $R^\times$ is continuous in the subspace topology of $R$ then these two topologies on $R^\times$ are the same.

If one does not require a ring to have a unit, then one has to add the requirement of continuity of the additive inverse, or equivalently, to define the topological ring as a ring that is a topological group (with respect to addition) in which multiplication is continuous, too.

== Examples ==
Topological rings occur in mathematical analysis, for example as rings of continuous real-valued functions on some topological space (where the topology is given by pointwise convergence), or as rings of continuous linear operators on some normed vector space; all Banach algebras are topological rings. The rational, real, complex and $p$-adic numbers are also topological rings (even topological fields, see below) with their standard topologies. In the plane, split-complex numbers and dual numbers form alternative topological rings. See hypercomplex numbers for other low-dimensional examples.

In commutative algebra, the following construction is common: given an ideal $I$ in a commutative ring $R,$ the I-adic topology on $R$ is defined as follows: a subset $U$ of $R$ is open if and only if for every $x \in U$ there exists a natural number $n$ such that $x + I^n \subseteq U.$ This turns $R$ into a topological ring. The $I$-adic topology is Hausdorff if and only if the intersection of all powers of $I$ is the zero ideal $(0).$

The $p$-adic topology on the integers is an example of an $I$-adic topology (with $I = p\Z$).

== Completion ==
Every topological ring is a topological group (with respect to addition) and hence a uniform space in a natural manner. One can thus ask whether a given topological ring $R$ is complete. If it is not, then it can be completed: one can find an essentially unique complete topological ring $S$ that contains $R$ as a dense subring such that the given topology on $R$ equals the subspace topology arising from $S.$ If the starting ring $R$ is metric, the ring $S$ can be constructed as a set of equivalence classes of Cauchy sequences in $R,$ this equivalence relation makes the ring $S$ Hausdorff and using constant sequences (which are Cauchy) one realizes a (uniformly) continuous morphism (CM in the sequel) $c : R \to S$ such that, for all CM $f : R \to T$ where $T$ is Hausdorff and complete, there exists a unique CM $g : S \to T$ such that $f = g \circ c.$ If $R$ is not metric (as, for instance, the ring of all real-variable rational valued functions, that is, all functions $f : \R \to \Q$ endowed with the topology of pointwise convergence) the standard construction uses minimal Cauchy filters and satisfies the same universal property as above (see Bourbaki, General Topology, III.6.5).

The rings of formal power series and the $p$-adic integers are most naturally defined as completions of certain topological rings carrying $I$-adic topologies.

== Topological fields ==
Some of the most important examples are topological fields. A topological field is a topological ring that is also a field, and such that inversion of non zero elements is a continuous function. The most common examples are the complex numbers and all its subfields, and the valued fields, which include the $p$-adic fields.

== See also ==
- Compact group – Topological group with compact topology
- Complete field
- Locally compact field
- Locally compact group
- Ordered topological vector space
- Strongly continuous semigroup – Generalization of the exponential function
- Topological abelian group
- Topological field – Algebraic structure with addition, multiplication, and division
- Topological group – Group that is a topological space with continuous group action
- Topological module
- Topological semigroup
- Topological vector space – Vector space with a notion of nearness
