= Topological module =

In mathematics, a topological module is a module over a topological ring such that scalar multiplication and addition are continuous.

== Examples ==
A module topology is the finest topology such that scalar multiplication and addition are continuous. A finitely generated module topology is a topological ring. Note that this general definition of a module topology does not need to have a ring structure, it merely needs the existence of addition and scalar multiplication.

A topological vector space is a topological module over a topological field.

An abelian topological group can be considered as a topological module over $\Z,$ where $\Z$ is the ring of integers with the discrete topology.

A topological ring is a topological module over each of its subrings.

A more complicated example is the $I$-adic topology on a ring and its modules. Let $I$ be an ideal of a ring $R.$ The sets of the form $x + I^n$ for all $x \in R$ and all positive integers $n,$ form a base for a topology on $R$ that makes $R$ into a topological ring. Then for any left $R$-module $M,$ the sets of the form $x + I^n M,$ for all $x \in M$ and all positive integers $n,$ form a base for a topology on $M$ that makes $M$ into a topological module over the topological ring $R.$

== See also ==
- Linear topology
- Ordered topological vector space
- Topological abelian group
- Topological field – Algebraic structure with addition, multiplication, and division
- Topological group – Group that is a topological space with continuous group operations
- Topological ring
- Topological semigroup
- Topological vector space – Vector space with a notion of nearness
