= Locally compact quantum group =

In mathematics and theoretical physics, a locally compact quantum group is a C*-algebraic approach toward quantum groups that generalizes the Kac algebra, compact-quantum-group and Hopf-algebra approaches. Earlier attempts at a unifying definition of quantum groups using, for example, multiplicative unitaries have enjoyed some success but have also encountered several technical problems.

One of the main features distinguishing this new approach from its predecessors is the axiomatic existence of left and right invariant weights. This gives a noncommutative analogue of left and right Haar measures on a locally compact Hausdorff group.

== Definitions ==
Before we can even begin to properly define a locally compact quantum group, we first need to define a number of preliminary concepts and also state a few theorems.

Definition (weight). Let $A$ be a C*-algebra, and let $A_{\geq 0}$ denote the set of positive elements of $A$. A weight on $A$ is a function $\phi: A_{\geq 0} \to [0,\infty]$ such that

- $\phi(a_{1} + a_{2}) = \phi(a_{1}) + \phi(a_{2})$ for all $a_{1},a_{2} \in A_{\geq 0}$, and
- $\phi(r \cdot a) = r \cdot \phi(a)$ for all $r \in [0,\infty)$ and $a \in A_{\geq 0}$.

Some notation for weights. Let $\phi$ be a weight on a C*-algebra $A$. We use the following notation:

- $\mathcal{M}_{\phi}^{+} := \{ a \in A_{\geq 0} \mid \phi(a) < \infty \}$, which is called the set of all positive $\phi$-integrable elements of $A$.
- $\mathcal{N}_{\phi} := \{ a \in A \mid \phi(a^{*} a) < \infty \}$, which is called the set of all $\phi$-square-integrable elements of $A$.
- $\mathcal{M}_{\phi} := \text{Span} ~ \mathcal{M}_{\phi}^{+} = \text{Span} ~ \mathcal{N}_{\phi}^{*} \mathcal{N}_{\phi}$, which is called the set of all $\phi$-integrable elements of $A$.

Types of weights. Let $\phi$ be a weight on a C*-algebra $A$.

- We say that $\phi$ is faithful if and only if $\phi(a) \neq 0$ for each non-zero $a \in A_{\geq 0}$.
- We say that $\phi$ is lower semi-continuous if and only if the set $\{ a \in A_{\geq 0} \mid \phi(a) \leq \lambda \}$ is a closed subset of $A$ for every $\lambda \in [0,\infty]$.
- We say that $\phi$ is densely defined if and only if $\mathcal{M}_{\phi}^{+}$ is a dense subset of $A_{\geq 0}$, or equivalently, if and only if either $\mathcal{N}_{\phi}$ or $\mathcal{M}_{\phi}$ is a dense subset of $A$.
- We say that $\phi$ is proper if and only if it is non-zero, lower semi-continuous and densely defined.

Definition (one-parameter group). Let $A$ be a C*-algebra. A one-parameter group on $A$ is a family $\alpha = (\alpha_{t})_{t \in \mathbb{R}}$ of *-automorphisms of $A$ that satisfies $\alpha_{s} \circ \alpha_{t} = \alpha_{s + t}$ for all $s,t \in \mathbb{R}$. We say that $\alpha$ is norm-continuous if and only if for every $a \in A$, the mapping $\mathbb{R} \to A$ defined by $t \mapsto {\alpha_{t}}(a)$ is continuous.

Definition (analytic extension of a one-parameter group). Given a norm-continuous one-parameter group $\alpha$ on a C*-algebra $A$, we are going to define an analytic extension of $\alpha$. For each $z \in \mathbb{C}$, let

$$I(z) := \{ y \in \mathbb{C} \mid |\Im(y)| \leq |\Im(z)| \}$$,

which is a horizontal strip in the complex plane. We call a function $f: I(z) \to A$ norm-regular if and only if the following conditions hold:

- It is analytic on the interior of $I(z)$, i.e., for each $y_{0}$ in the interior of $I(z)$, the limit $\displaystyle \lim_{y \to y_{0}} \frac{f(y) - f(y_{0})}{y - y_{0}}$ exists with respect to the norm topology on $A$.
- It is norm-bounded on $I(z)$.
- It is norm-continuous on $I(z)$.

Suppose now that $z \in \mathbb{C} \setminus \mathbb{R}$, and let

$$D_{z} := \{ a \in A \mid \text{There exists a norm-regular} ~ f: I(z) \to A ~ \text{such that} ~ f(t) = {\alpha_{t}}(a) ~ \text{for all} ~ t \in \mathbb{R} \}.$$

Define $\alpha_{z}: D_{z} \to A$ by ${\alpha_{z}}(a) := f(z)$. The function $f$ is uniquely determined (by the theory of complex-analytic functions), so $\alpha_{z}$ is well-defined indeed. The family $(\alpha_{z})_{z \in \mathbb{C}}$ is then called the analytic extension of $\alpha$.

Theorem 1. The set $\cap_{z \in \mathbb{C}} D_{z}$, called the set of analytic elements of $A$, is a dense subset of $A$.

Definition (K.M.S. weight). Let $A$ be a C*-algebra and $\phi: A_{\geq 0} \to [0,\infty]$ a weight on $A$. We say that $\phi$ is a K.M.S. weight ('K.M.S.' stands for 'Kubo-Martin-Schwinger') on $A$ if and only if $\phi$ is a proper weight on $A$ and there exists a norm-continuous one-parameter group $(\sigma_{t})_{t \in \mathbb{R}}$ on $A$ such that

- $\phi$ is invariant under $\sigma$, i.e., $\phi \circ \sigma_{t} = \phi$ for all $t \in \mathbb{R}$, and
- for every $a \in \text{Dom}(\sigma_{i / 2})$, we have $\phi(a^{*} a) = \phi(\sigma_{i / 2}(a) [\sigma_{i / 2}(a)]^{*})$.

We denote by $M(A)$ the multiplier algebra of $A$.

Theorem 2. If $A$ and $B$ are C*-algebras and $\pi: A \to M(B)$ is a non-degenerate *-homomorphism (i.e., $\pi[A] B$ is a dense subset of $B$), then we can uniquely extend $\pi$ to a *-homomorphism $\overline{\pi}: M(A) \to M(B)$.

Theorem 3. If $\omega: A \to \mathbb{C}$ is a state (i.e., a positive linear functional of norm $1$) on $A$, then we can uniquely extend $\omega$ to a state $\overline{\omega}: M(A) \to \mathbb{C}$ on $M(A)$.

Definition (Locally compact quantum group). A (C*-algebraic) locally compact quantum group is an ordered pair $\mathcal{G} = (A,\Delta)$, where $A$ is a C*-algebra and $\Delta: A \to M(A \otimes A)$ is a non-degenerate *-homomorphism called the co-multiplication, that satisfies the following four conditions:

- The co-multiplication is co-associative, i.e., $\overline{\Delta \otimes \iota} \circ \Delta = \overline{\iota \otimes \Delta} \circ \Delta$.
- The sets $\left\{ \overline{\omega \otimes \text{id}}(\Delta(a)) ~ \big| ~ \omega \in A^{*}, ~ a \in A \right\}$ and $\left\{ \overline{\text{id} \otimes \omega}(\Delta(a)) ~ \big| ~ \omega \in A^{*}, ~ a \in A \right\}$ are linearly dense subsets of $A$.
- There exists a faithful K.M.S. weight $\phi$ on $A$ that is left-invariant, i.e., $\phi \! \left( \overline{\omega \otimes \text{id}}(\Delta(a)) \right) = \overline{\omega}(1_{M(A)}) \cdot \phi(a)$ for all $\omega \in A^{*}$ and $a \in \mathcal{M}_{\phi}^{+}$.
- There exists a K.M.S. weight $\psi$ on $A$ that is right-invariant, i.e., $\psi \! \left( \overline{\text{id} \otimes \omega}(\Delta(a)) \right) = \overline{\omega}(1_{M(A)}) \cdot \psi(a)$ for all $\omega \in A^{*}$ and $a \in \mathcal{M}_{\phi}^{+}$.

From the definition of a locally compact quantum group, it can be shown that the right-invariant K.M.S. weight $\psi$ is automatically faithful. Therefore, the faithfulness of $\psi$ is a redundant condition and does not need to be postulated.

== Duality ==
The category of locally compact quantum groups allows for a dual construction with which one can prove that the bi-dual of a locally compact quantum group is isomorphic to the original one. This result gives a far-reaching generalization of Pontryagin duality for locally compact Hausdorff abelian groups.

== Alternative formulations ==
The theory has an equivalent formulation in terms of von Neumann algebras.

== See also ==
- Locally compact space
- Locally compact field
- Locally compact group
