= Locally compact field =

In algebra, a locally compact field is a topological field whose topology forms a locally compact Hausdorff space. These kinds of fields were originally introduced in p-adic analysis since the fields $\mathbb{Q}_p$ of p-adic numbers are locally compact topological spaces constructed from the norm $|\cdot|_p$ on $\mathbb{Q}$. The topology (and metric space structure) is essential because it allows one to construct analogues of algebraic number fields in the p-adic context.

With the discrete topology, all fields are locally compact. A locally compact field that is not discrete is known as a local field.

== Structure ==
=== Finite dimensional vector spaces ===
One of the useful structure theorems for vector spaces over locally compact fields is that the finite dimensional vector spaces have only one equivalence class of norms: the sup norm. ^{pg. 58-59}

=== Finite field extensions ===
Given a finite field extension $K/F$ over a locally compact field $F$, there is at most one unique field norm $|\cdot|_K$ on $K$ extending the field norm $|\cdot|_F$; that is,
$$|f|_K = |f|_F$$
for all $f\in K$ which is in the image of $F \hookrightarrow K$. Note this follows from the previous theorem and the following trick: if $\|\cdot\|_1,\|\cdot\|_2$ are two equivalent norms, and
$$\|x\|_1 < \|x\|_2$$
then for a fixed constant $c_1$ there exists an $N_0 \in \mathbb{N}$ such that
$$\left(\frac{\|x\|_1}{\|x\|_2} \right)^N < \frac{1}{c_1}$$
for all $N \geq N_0$ since the sequence generated from the powers of $N$ converge to $0$.

==== Finite Galois extensions ====
If the extension is of degree $n = [K:F]$ and $K/F$ is a Galois extension, (so all solutions to the minimal polynomial, or conjugate elements, of any $a \in K$ are also contained in $K$) then the unique field norm $|\cdot|_K$ can be constructed using the field norm ^{pg. 61}. This is defined as
$$|a|_K = |N_{K/F}(a)|^{1/n}$$
Note the n-th root is required in order to have a well-defined field norm extending the one over $F$ since given any $f \in K$ in the image of $F \hookrightarrow K$ its norm is
$$N_{K/F}(f) = \det m_f = f^n$$
since it acts as scalar multiplication on the $F$-vector space $K$.

== Examples ==
=== Finite fields ===
All finite fields are locally compact since they can be equipped with the discrete topology. In particular, any field with the discrete topology is locally compact since every point is the neighborhood of itself, and also the closure of the neighborhood, hence is compact.

=== Local fields ===
The main examples of locally compact fields are the p-adic rationals $\mathbb{Q}_p$ and finite extensions $K/\mathbb{Q}_p$. Each of these are examples of local fields. Note the algebraic closure $\overline{\mathbb{Q}}_p$ and its completion $\mathbb{C}_p$ are not locally compact fields ^{pg. 72} with their standard topology.

==== Field extensions of Q_{p} ====
Field extensions $K/\mathbb{Q}_p$ can be found by using Hensel's lemma. For example, $f(x) = x^2 - 7 = x^2 - (2 + 1\cdot 5 )$ has no solutions in $\mathbb{Q}_5$ since
$$\frac{d}{dx}(x^2 - 5) = 2x$$
only equals zero mod $p$ if $x \equiv 0 \text{ } (p)$, but $x^2 - 7$ has no solutions mod $5$. Hence $\mathbb{Q}_5(\sqrt{7})/\mathbb{Q}_5$ is a quadratic field extension.

== See also ==
- Complete field
- Locally compact group – Type of topological group in mathematics
- Ramification of local fields – Mathematical topic
- Topological abelian group
- Topological group – Group that is a topological space with continuous group operations
- Topological ring
