= Distortion (disambiguation) =

Distortion denotes the alteration of the original shape of an object, image, sound, or waveform.

Distortion may also refer to:

== Science and technology ==
- Distortion (optics), including "barrel distortion" and "pincushion distortion"
  - Perspective distortion
- Cognitive distortion, thoughts that are exaggerated and irrational
- Parataxic distortion, inclination to skew perceptions of others based on fantasy
- Distortions (economics), a concept in economics
- Distortion function, used to define distortion risk measures
- In mathematics, distortion has several meanings, including:
  - Distortion (mathematics), a measure of how much a function distorts angles
  - Stretch factor, also called distortion, a measure of how much a function distorts distances between points
  - Subgroup distortion, a related idea in geometric group theory

== Media ==
=== Film ===
- Distortion (film), a 2023 Filipino non-narrative animated film

=== Music ===
- Distortion (music), an electro-acoustic effect in music
- Copenhagen Distortion, also called 'Distortion festival', a party/club culture festival in Copenhagen, Denmark
- Social Distortion, an American punk rock band

==== Albums and EPs ====
- Distortion (Forbidden album), 1995
- Distortion (The Magnetic Fields album), 2008
- Distortion (Joseph Simmons album), 2005
- Distortions (album), a 1967 album by the Litter
- Distortion (the Proletariat EP), 1982
- Distortion (Game Theory EP), 1984

==== Songs ====
- "Distortion" (Jessica Sutta song), 2016
- "Distortion" (Babymetal song), 2018

== Other ==
- "Distortion", an episode of the anime TV series Serial Experiments Lain

== See also ==
- Deformation (disambiguation)
- Distort (disambiguation)
- Distorted (disambiguation)
