= Distortion problem =

In functional analysis, a branch of mathematics, the distortion problem is to determine by how much one can distort the unit sphere in a given Banach space using an equivalent norm. Specifically, a Banach space X is called λ-distortable if there exists an equivalent norm |x| on X such that, for all infinite-dimensional subspaces Y in X,

$$\sup_{y_1,y_2\in Y, \|y_i\|=1} \frac{|y_1|}{|y_2|} \ge \lambda$$

(see distortion (mathematics)). Note that every Banach space is trivially 1-distortable. A Banach space is called distortable if it is λ-distortable for some λ > 1 and it is called arbitrarily distortable if it is λ-distortable for any λ. Distortability first emerged as an important property of Banach spaces in the 1960s, where it was studied by James (1964) and Milman (1971).

James proved that c_{0} and ℓ^{1} are not distortable. Milman showed that if X is a Banach space that does not contain an isomorphic copy of c_{0} or ℓ^{p} for some 1 ≤ p < ∞ (see sequence space), then some infinite-dimensional subspace of X is distortable. So the distortion problem is now primarily of interest on the spaces ℓ^{p}, all of which are separable and uniform convex, for 1 < p < ∞.

In separable and uniform convex spaces, distortability is easily seen to be equivalent to the ostensibly more general question of whether or not every real-valued Lipschitz function ƒ defined on the sphere in X stabilizes on the sphere of an infinite dimensional subspace, i.e., whether there is a real number a ∈ R so that for every δ > 0 there is an infinite dimensional subspace Y of X, so that |a − ƒ(y)| < δ, for all y ∈ Y, with ||y|| = 1. But it follows from the result of Odell & Schlumprecht (1994) that on ℓ^{1} there are Lipschitz functions which do not stabilize, although this space is not distortable by James (1964). In a separable Hilbert space, the distortion problem is equivalent to the question of whether there exist subsets of the unit sphere separated by a positive distance and yet intersect every infinite-dimensional closed subspace. Unlike many properties of Banach spaces, the distortion problem seems to be as difficult on Hilbert spaces as on other Banach spaces. On a separable Hilbert space, and for the other ℓ^{p}-spaces, 1 < p < ∞, the distortion problem was solved affirmatively by Odell & Schlumprecht (1994), who showed that ℓ^{2} is arbitrarily distortable, using the first known arbitrarily distortable space constructed by Schlumprecht (1991).

== See also ==
- Tsirelson space
- Banach space
