= Taivo =

Male given name

- Gender: Male
- Language: Estonian
- Name day: 17 May

Origin
- Region of origin: Estonia

Other names
- Related names: Taido, Taidur, Taimar, Taimo

Taivo is an Estonian masculine given name.

As of 1 January 2021, 926 men in Estonia bear the name Taivo, making it the 178th most popular male name in the country. The name is the most popular in Põlva County, where there 16.16 per 10,000 inhabitants of the county bear the name.

Individuals bearing the name Taivo include:

- Taivo Arak (1946–2007), mathematician
- Taivo Kastepõld (1942–2019), ornithologist
- Taivo Kuus (born 1969), cross-country skier
- Taivo Linna (1941–1996), musician and artist
- Taivo Mägi (born 1960), track and field athlete and coach
- Taivo Rist (born 1971), draughts player and science fiction writer
