= Borell–TIS inequality =

In mathematics and probability, the Borell–TIS inequality is a result bounding the probability of a deviation of the uniform norm of a centered Gaussian stochastic process above its expected value. The result is named for Christer Borell and its independent discoverers Boris Tsirelson, Ildar Ibragimov, and Vladimir Sudakov. The inequality has been described as "the single most important tool in the study of Gaussian processes."

== Statement ==
Let $T$ be a topological space, and let $\{ f_t \}_{t \in T}$ be a centered (i.e. mean zero) Gaussian process on $T$, with

$$\| f \|_T := \sup_{t \in T} | f_t |$$

almost surely finite, and let

$$\sigma_T^2 := \sup_{t \in T} \operatorname{E}| f_t |^2.$$

Then $\operatorname{E}(\| f \|_T)$ and $\sigma_T$ are both finite, and, for each $u > 0$,

$$\operatorname{P} \big( \| f \|_T > \operatorname{E}(\| f \|_T) + u \big) \leq \exp\left(  \frac{- u^2}{2\sigma_T^2} \right).$$

Another related statement which is also known as the Borell-TIS inequality is that, under the same conditions as above,

$$\operatorname{P}\big(\sup_{t\in T}f_t>\operatorname{E}(\sup_{t\in T}f_t)+u\big) \le \exp\bigg(\frac{-u^2}{2\sigma_T^2}\bigg)$$,

and so by symmetry

$$\operatorname{P}\big(|\sup_{t\in T}f_t-\operatorname{E}(\sup_{t\in T}f_t)|>u\big) \le 2\exp\bigg(\frac{-u^2}{2\sigma_T^2}\bigg)$$.

== See also ==
- Gaussian isoperimetric inequality
