= Distorted =

Distorted may refer to:

- Anything subject to distortion
- Distorted (band), a progressive deathdoom metal band from Bat-Yam, Israel
- Distorted (EP), an extended play by the band Distorted
- Distorted (film), a 2018 Canadian thriller
- Distorted Music Festival, a 2005 Australian music festival
- Distorted (TV series), a 2017 South Korean television series
- Distorted, a 2001 demo album by Biomechanical
- Beatmania IIDX 13: Distorted, an arcade game

== See also ==
- Distort (disambiguation)
- Distortion (disambiguation)
