= Bobkov's inequality =

In probability theory, Bobkov's inequality is a functional isoperimetric inequality for the canonical Gaussian measure. It generalizes the Gaussian isoperimetric inequality. The equation was proven in 1997 by the Russian mathematician Sergey Bobkov.

== Bobkov's inequality ==
Notation:

Let

- $\gamma^n(dx)=(2\pi)^{-n/2}e^{-\|x\|^2/2}d^nx$ be the canonical Gaussian measure on $\R^n$ with respect to the Lebesgue measure,
- $\phi(x)=(2\pi)^{-1/2}e^{-x^2/2}$ be the one dimensional canonical Gaussian density
- $\Phi(t)=\gamma^1[-\infty,t]$ the cumulative distribution function
- $I(t):=\phi(\Phi^{-1}(t))$ be a function $I(t):[0,1]\to [0,1]$ that vanishes at the end points $\lim\limits_{t\to 0} I(t)=\lim\limits_{t\to 1} I(t)=0.$

=== Statement ===
For every locally Lipschitz continuous (or smooth) function $f:\R^n\to[0,1]$ the following inequality holds

$$I\left( \int_{\R^n} f d\gamma^n(dx)\right)\leq \int_{\R^n} \sqrt{I(f)^2+|\nabla f|^2}d\gamma^n(dx).$$

== Generalizations ==
There exists a generalization by Dominique Bakry and Michel Ledoux.
