= Rheid =

In geology, a rheid /ˈriːɪd/ is a substance whose temperature is below its melting point and whose deformation by viscous flow during the time of observation is at least three orders of magnitude (1,000 ×) greater than the elastic deformation under the given conditions. A material is a rheid by virtue of the time of observation. The term, coined by S. Warren Carey in 1953, has the same Greek root as rheology, the science of viscoelasticity and nonlinear flow.

== Types of rheids ==
Almost any type of rock can behave as a rheid under appropriate conditions of temperature and pressure. For example, the Earth's mantle undergoes convection over long time-scales. As the mantle supports the propagation of shear waves, it may be deduced that it is a solid and, therefore, behaving as a rheid when it undergoes said convection. Granite has a measured viscosity at standard temperature and pressure of about 4.5×10^{19} Pa·s so it should be considered a rheid. Similarly halite, the mineral form of table salt, is a geological material that behaves as a rheid over relatively short time-periods. As salt is buried by other types of sediments, it will often flow laterally towards regions of lower confining stress. Through this mechanism, salt domes and other structures may form. In some areas, such as the Gulf of Mexico, these structures often serve as traps for petroleum and natural gas.
