= Gaussian isoperimetric inequality =

Inequality applying to Eudlidean space and half-spaces

In mathematics, the Gaussian isoperimetric inequality, proved by Boris Tsirelson and Vladimir Sudakov, and later independently by Christer Borell, states that among all sets of given Gaussian measure in the n-dimensional Euclidean space, half-spaces have the minimal Gaussian boundary measure.

== Mathematical formulation ==
Let $\scriptstyle A$ be a measurable subset of $\scriptstyle\mathbf{R}^n$ endowed with the standard Gaussian measure $\gamma^n$ with the density ${\exp(-\|x\|^2/2)}/(2\pi)^{n/2}$. Denote by

$$A_\varepsilon = \left\{ x \in \mathbf{R}^n \, | \,
\text{dist}(x, A) \leq \varepsilon \right\}$$

the ε-extension of A. Then the Gaussian isoperimetric inequality states that

$$\liminf_{\varepsilon \to +0}
\varepsilon^{-1} \left\{ \gamma^n (A_\varepsilon) - \gamma^n(A) \right\}
\geq \varphi(\Phi^{-1}(\gamma^n(A))),$$

where

$$\varphi(t) = \frac{\exp(-t^2/2)}{\sqrt{2\pi}}\quad{\rm and}\quad\Phi(t) = \int_{-\infty}^t \varphi(s)\, ds.$$

== Proofs and generalizations ==
The original proofs by Sudakov, Tsirelson and Borell were based on Paul Lévy's spherical isoperimetric inequality.

Sergey Bobkov proved Bobkov's inequality, a functional generalization of the Gaussian isoperimetric inequality, proved from a certain "two point analytic inequality". Bakry and Ledoux gave another proof of Bobkov's functional inequality based on the semigroup techniques which works in a much more abstract setting. Later Barthe and Maurey gave yet another proof using the Brownian motion.

The Gaussian isoperimetric inequality also follows from Ehrhard's inequality.

== See also ==
- Concentration of measure
- Borell–TIS inequality
