= Sergey Bobkov =

Russian mathematician

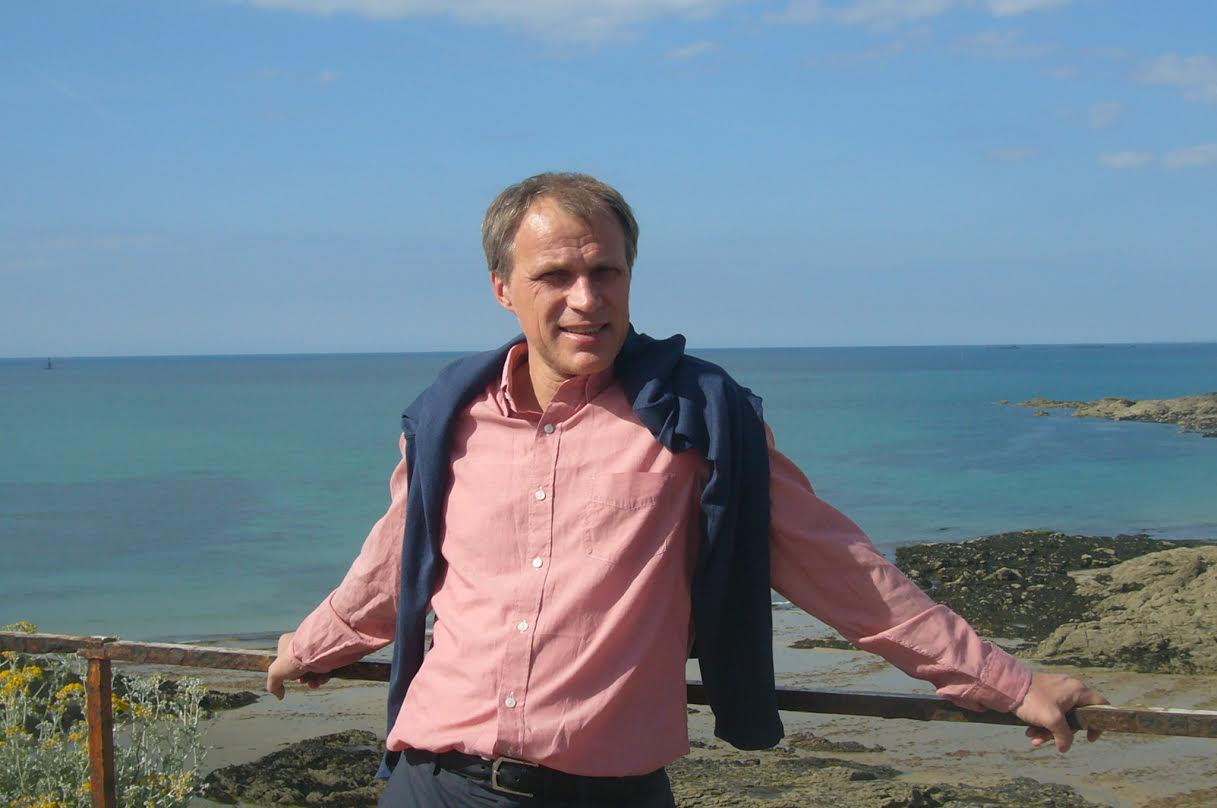
- Born: 15 March 1961 (age 65); Vorkuta, Komi Republic
- Education: Leningrad State University
- Known for: Bobkov's inequality; Isoperimetric problems; Concentration of measure
- Awards: Simons Fellowship (2012); Humboldt Research Award (2014)
- Scientific career
- Fields: Mathematics
- Doctoral advisor: Vladimir N. Sudakov

Sergey Bobkov (Russian: Сергей Германович Бобков; born 15 March 1961) is a Russian mathematician. Currently Bobkov is a professor at the University of Minnesota, Twin Cities.

He was born in Vorkuta (Komi Republic, Russia) and graduated from the Department of Mathematics and Mechanics in Leningrad State University. In 1988 he earned PhD in Mathematics and Physics (under direction of Vladimir N. Sudakov, Steklov Institute of Mathematics) and in 1997 earned his Doctor of Science. During 1998–2000 Bobkov held positions at Syktyvkar State University, Russia. From 1995 to 1996 he was an Alexander von Humboldt Fellow at Bielefeld University, Germany. He spent the summers of 2001 and 2002 as an EPSRC Fellow at Imperial College London, UK. Bobkov was awarded a Simons Fellowship (2012) and Humboldt Research Award (2014).

Bobkov is known for research in mathematics on the border of probability theory, analysis, convex geometry and information theory. He has achieved important results about isoperimetric problems, concentration of measure and other high-dimensional phenomena.

Bobkov's inequality is named after him.
