= Boris Tsirelson =

Russian–Israeli mathematician (1950–2020)

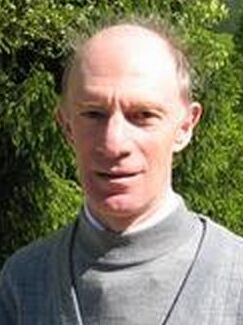
- Tsirelson in 2005
- Born: May 4, 1950; Leningrad, Soviet Union
- Died: January 21, 2020 (aged 69); Basel, Switzerland
- Known for: Tsirelson's bound; Tsirelson space; Tsirelson's stochastic differential equation; Gaussian isoperimetric inequality
- Scientific career
- Thesis: General properties of bounded Gaussian processes and related questions (1975)
- Doctoral advisor: Ildar Ibragimov

Boris Semyonovich Tsirelson (Hebrew: בוריס סמיונוביץ' צירלסון, Russian: Борис Семёнович Цирельсон; May 4, 1950 – January 21, 2020) was a Russian–Israeli mathematician and Professor of Mathematics at Tel Aviv University in Israel, as well as a Wikipedia editor.

== Biography ==
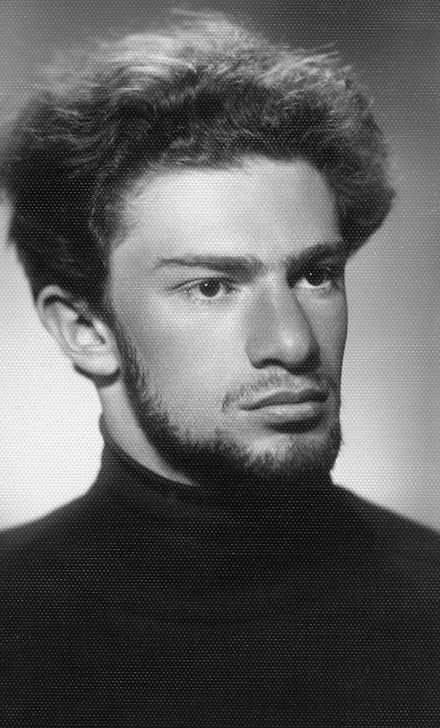
Tsirelson while a first-year student, in 1967

Tsirelson was born in Leningrad to a Russian Jewish family. From his father Simeon's side, he was the great-nephew of rabbi Yehuda Leib Tsirelson, chief rabbi of Bessarabia from 1918 to 1941, and a prominent posek and Jewish leader. He obtained his Master of Science from the University of Leningrad and remained there to pursue graduate studies. He obtained his Ph.D. in 1975, with thesis "General properties of bounded Gaussian processes and related questions" written under the direction of Ildar Abdulovich Ibragimov.

Later, he participated in the refusenik movement, but only received permission to immigrate to Israel in 1991. From then until 2017, he was a professor at Tel-Aviv University.

He also worked on fault-tolerant cellular automaton.

In 1998 he was an Invited Speaker at the International Congress of Mathematicians in Berlin.

== Contributions to mathematics ==
Tsirelson made notable contributions to probability theory and functional analysis. These include:

- Tsirelson's bound, in quantum mechanics, is an inequality, related to the issue of quantum nonlocality.
- Tsirelson space is an example of a reflexive Banach space in which neither a l^{p} space nor a c_{0} space can be embedded.
- The Tsirelson's drift, a counterexample in the theory of stochastic differential equations, is an SDE which has a weak solution but no strong solution.
- The Gaussian isoperimetric inequality (proved by Vladimir Sudakov and Tsirelson, and independently by Christer Borell), stating that affine halfspaces are the isoperimetric sets for the Gaussian measure.

== Death ==
Tsirelson died on January 21, 2020, at the age of 69.
