= Michel Talagrand =

French mathematician (born 1952)

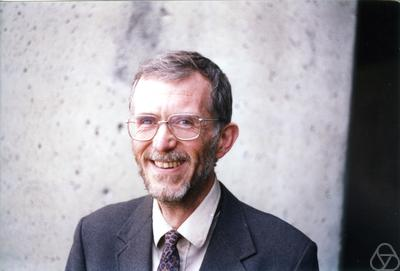
- Talagrand in 1995
- Born: 15 February 1952 (age 74); Béziers, France
- Education: University of Lyon (BSc); Pierre and Marie Curie University (MSc, PhD)
- Known for: Talagrand's concentration inequality Spin glasses
- Awards: Loève Prize (1995); Fermat Prize (1997); Shaw Prize (2019); Abel Prize (2024)
- Scientific career
- Fields: Mathematics
- Institutions: CNRS
- Doctoral advisor: Gustave Choquet

Michel Pierre Talagrand (French pronunciation: [miʃɛl pjɛʁ talaɡʁɑ̃]; born 15 February 1952) is a French mathematician working in probability theory, functional analysis and mathematical physics. Since 1985, he has been the directeur de recherches at CNRS and a member of the Functional Analysis Team of the Institut de mathématiques de Jussieu in Paris. Talagrand was also a faculty member at The Ohio State University for more than fifteen years. Talagrand was elected as correspondent of the Académie des sciences of Paris in March 1997, and then as a full member in November 2004, in the Mathematics section. In 2024, Talagrand received the Abel Prize.

Talagrand studies mainly functional analysis and probability theory and their applications.

== Career ==
Talagrand has been interested in probability with minimal structure, aiming at proving in a rigorous mathematical form, statements, heuristics and formulas that have proven to be useful in the theoretical and experimental side of physics. He has obtained a complete characterization of bounded Gaussian processes in very general settings, and also new methods to bound stochastic processes. He discovered new aspects of the isoperimetric and concentration of measure phenomena for product spaces, by obtaining inequalities which make use of new kinds of distances between a point and a subset of a product space. These inequalities show in great generality that a random quantity which depends on many independent variables, without depending too much on any one of them, has only small fluctuations. These inequalities helped to solve several classical problems in probability theory on Banach spaces, and have also transformed the abstract theory of stochastic processes. These inequalities have been successfully used in many applications involving stochastic quantities, like for instance in statistical mechanics (disordered systems), theoretical computer science, random matrices, and statistics (empirical processes).

Talagrand commented in the introduction to his two-volume monograph on mean field models of spin glasses:

More generally theoretical physicists have discovered wonderful new areas of mathematics, which they have explored by their methods. This book is an attempt to correct this anomaly by exploring these areas using mathematical methods, and an attempt to bring these marvelous questions to the attention of the mathematical community.

In particular, the monograph offers an exposition of Talagrand's proof of the validity of the Parisi formula.

Talagrand was awarded the Abel Prize from The Norwegian Academy of Science and Letters for 2024 for his work in ‘Suprema of stochastic processes’, ‘Concentration of measures’ and ‘Spin glass’.

== Personal life ==
He is married to Wansoo Rhee, a now retired professor of management science at The Ohio State University, whom he met on his first ever trip to the USA. They have two sons.

== Awards ==
- Peccot Lectures of the French Collège de France (1980)
- Peccot-Vimont Prize of the French Collège de France (1980)
- Servant Prize of the French Académie des sciences (1985)
- Invited Speaker to the International Congress of Mathematicians (Kyoto 1990)
- Loève Prize in Probability (1995)
- Fermat Prize for mathematical research (1997)
- Corresponding member of the French Academy of Sciences (1997)
- Plenary Speaker to the International Congress of Mathematicians (Berlin 1998)
- Member of the French Academy of Sciences (2004)
- Chevalier of the Order of the Legion of Honor (2011)
- Shaw Prize in mathematics (2019)
- Stefan Banach Medal of the Polish Academy of Sciences (2022)
- The Abel Prize (2024)

== Selected publications ==
- Talagrand, Michel (1979). "Espaces de Banach Faiblement κ-Analytiques". Annals of Mathematics. 110 (3). JSTOR: 407–438. doi:10.2307/1971232. ISSN 0003-486X. JSTOR 1971232.
- Talagrand, Michel (1987). "Regularity of gaussian processes". Acta Mathematica. 159. International Press of Boston: 99–149. doi:10.1007/bf02392556. ISSN 0001-5962. S2CID 121218656.
- Rhee, Wansoo T.; Talagrand, Michel (1988). "Some distributions that allow perfect packing". Journal of the ACM. 35 (3). Association for Computing Machinery (ACM): 564–578. doi:10.1145/44483.44487. ISSN 0004-5411. S2CID 14177183.
- Talagrand, Michel (1990). "The Three-Space Problem for L 1". Journal of the American Mathematical Society. 3 (1). JSTOR: 9–29. doi:10.2307/1990983. ISSN 0894-0347. JSTOR 1990983.
- Talagrand, Michel (1992). "Type, infratype and the Elton-Pajor theorem". Inventiones Mathematicae. 107 (1). Springer Science and Business Media LLC: 41–59. Bibcode:1992InMat.107...41T. doi:10.1007/bf01231880. ISSN 0020-9910. S2CID 121425985.
- Talagrand, M. (1 January 1994). "Sharper Bounds for Gaussian and Empirical Processes". Annals of Probability. 22 (1). Institute of Mathematical Statistics. doi:10.1214/aop/1176988847. ISSN 0091-1798.
- Talagrand, M. (1994). "Matching theorems and empirical discrepancy computations using majorizing measures". Journal of the American Mathematical Society. 7 (2). American Mathematical Society (AMS): 455–537. doi:10.1090/s0894-0347-1994-1227476-x. ISSN 0894-0347.
- Talagrand, Michel (1995). "Concentration of measure and isoperimetric inequalities in product spaces". Publications Mathématiques de l'IHÉS. 81 (1). Springer Science and Business Media LLC: 73–205. arXiv:math/9406212. doi:10.1007/bf02699376. ISSN 0073-8301. S2CID 119668709.
- Talagrand, Michel (1995). "Sections of smooth convex bodies via majorizing measures". Acta Mathematica. 175 (2). International Press of Boston: 273–300. doi:10.1007/bf02393307. ISSN 0001-5962. S2CID 120408547.
- Talagrand, Michel (1 January 2006). "The Parisi formula". Annals of Mathematics. 163 (1): 221–263. doi:10.4007/annals.2006.163.221. ISSN 0003-486X.
- Talagrand, Michel (2006). "Maharam's problem". Comptes Rendus Mathematique. 342 (7). Elsevier BV: 501–503. arXiv:math/0601689. Bibcode:2006math......1689T. doi:10.1016/j.crma.2006.01.026. ISSN 1631-073X.

== Reference Books ==
- Talagrand, Michel (1984). Pettis integral and measure theory. Providence, R.I., USA: American Mathematical Society. ISBN 978-0-8218-2307-1. OCLC 851088223.
- Ledoux, Michel (1991). Probability in Banach Spaces : Isoperimetry and Processes. Berlin, Heidelberg: Springer Berlin Heidelberg. ISBN 978-3-642-20212-4. OCLC 851818740.
- Talagrand, Michel (2003). Spin glasses : a challenge for mathematicians : cavity and mean field models. Berlin New York: Springer. ISBN 978-3-540-00356-4. OCLC 52509569.
- Talagrand, Michel (2005). The generic chaining : upper and lower bounds of stochastic processes. Berlin: Springer. ISBN 978-3-540-27499-5. OCLC 262680717.
- Talagrand, Michel (2011). Mean field models for spin glasses. Berlin Heidelberg: Springer. ISBN 978-3-642-15202-3. OCLC 695389115.
- Talagrand, Michel (2011). Mean field models for spin glasses. Berlin: Springer. ISBN 978-3-642-22253-5. OCLC 755538109.
- Talagrand, Michel (2014). Upper and lower bounds for stochastic processes : modern methods and classical problems. Heidelberg: Springer. ISBN 978-3-642-54075-2. OCLC 871255685.
- Talagrand, Michel (21 December 2021). Upper and Lower Bounds for Stochastic Processes: Decomposition Theorems. Ergebnisse der Mathematik und ihrer Grenzgebiete. 3. Folge / A Series of Modern Surveys in Mathematics. Vol. 60. Springer Cham. doi:10.1007/978-3-030-82595-9. ISBN 978-3-030-82594-2. S2CID 123995577.
- Talagrand, Michel (22 February 2022). What Is a Quantum Field Theory?. Cambridge University Press. Bibcode:2022wiqf.book.....T. doi:10.1017/9781108225144. ISBN 978-1-108-22514-4. S2CID 247078928.

== See also ==
- Talagrand's concentration inequality
