= Banach-Saks property =

Property of certain normed spaces

Banach-Saks property is a property of certain normed vector spaces stating that every bounded sequence of points in the space has a subsequence that is convergent in the mean (also known as Cesàro summation or limesable). Specifically, for every bounded sequence $(x_n)_n$ in the space, there exists a subsequence $(x_{n_k})_k$ such that the sequence

$$\left(\frac{x_{n_1}+\ldots+x_{n_k}}{k}\right)_{k=1}^\infty$$

is convergent (in the sense of the norm). Sequences satisfying this property are called Banach-Saks sequences.

The concept is named after Polish mathematicians Stefan Banach and Stanisław Saks, who extended Mazur's theorem, which states that the weak limit of a sequence in a Banach space is the limit in the norm of convex combinations of the sequence's terms. They showed that in L_{p}(0,1) spaces, for $1 < p < \infty$, there exists a sequence of convex combinations of the original sequence that is also Cesàro summable. This result was further generalized by Shizuo Kakutani to uniformly convex spaces. Wiesław Szlenk introduced the "weak Banach-Saks property", replacing the bounded sequence condition with a sequence weakly convergent to zero, and proved that the space $L_1 (0,1)$ has this property. The definitions of both Banach-Saks properties extend analogously to subsets of normed spaces.

== Theorems and examples ==
- Every Banach space with the Banach-Saks property is reflexive. However, there exist reflexive spaces without this property, with the first example provided by Albert Baernstein.
- Józef Schreier provided the first example of a space (the so-called Schreier space) lacking the weak Banach-Saks property. He also proved that the space of continuous functions on the ordinal $\omega^\omega + 1$ lacks this property.
- ℓ_{p}-sums of spaces with the Banach-Saks property retain this property.
- There exists a space $E$ with the Banach-Saks property for which the space $L_2 (E)$ (square-integrable functions in the Bochner sense with values in $E$) lacks this property.
- The image of a strictly additive vector measure has the Banach-Saks property.
- If a Banach space $E$ has a dual space $E^*$ that is uniformly convex, then $E$ has the Banach-Saks property.
- The dual space of the Schlumprecht space has the Banach-Saks property.

== p-BS property and Banach-Saks index ==
For a fixed real number $p \geqslant 1$, a bounded sequence $(x_n)_n$ in a Banach space $X$ is called a p-BS sequence if it contains a subsequence $(x_{n_k})_k$ such that

$$\sup_{m\in \mathbb{N}}\frac{1}{m^{\frac{1}{p}}}\Bigg\|\sum_{i=1}^m x_{n_i}\Bigg\|<\infty.$$

A Banach space is said to have the p-BS property if every sequence weakly convergent to zero contains a subsequence that is a p-BS sequence. The p-BS property does not generalize the Banach-Saks property. Notably, every Banach space has the 1-BS property. The set

$$\Gamma(X)=\{p\geqslant 1\colon\, X\text{ has the }p\text{-BS property}\}$$

is of the form $[0, \gamma_0)$ or $[0, \gamma_0]$, where $\gamma_0 \geqslant 1$. If $\Gamma(X) = [0, \gamma_0]$, the Banach-Saks index $\gamma(X)$ of the space $X$ is defined as $\gamma(X) = \gamma_0$; if $\Gamma(X) = [0, \gamma_0)$, then $\gamma_0 = 0$. For example, the space $L_2 (0,1)$ has the 2-BS property.
