= Tsirelson's stochastic differential equation =

Tsirelson's stochastic differential equation (also Tsirelson's drift or Tsirelson's equation) is a stochastic differential equation which has a weak solution but no strong solution. It is therefore a counter-example and named after its discoverer Boris Tsirelson. Tsirelson's equation is of the form

$$dX_t = a[t,(X_s, s\leq t)]dt + dW_t, \quad X_0=0,$$

where $W_t$ is the one-dimensional Brownian motion. Tsirelson chose the drift $a$ to be a bounded measurable function that depends on the past times of $X$ but is independent of the natural filtration $\mathcal{F}^W$ of the Brownian motion. This gives a weak solution, but since the process $X$ is not $\mathcal{F}_{\infty}^W$-measurable, not a strong solution.

== Tsirelson's Drift ==
Let

- $\mathcal{F}_t^{W}=\sigma(W_s : 0 \leq s \leq t)$ and $\{\mathcal{F}_t^{W}\} _{t\in \R_+}$ be the natural Brownian filtration that satisfies the usual conditions,
- $t_0=1$ and $(t_n)_{n\in-\N}$ be a descending sequence $t_0>t_{-1}>t_{-2} >\dots,$ such that $\lim_{n\to -\infty } t_n=0$,
- $\Delta X_{t_n}=X_{t_n}-X_{t_{n-1}}$ and $\Delta t_n=t_n-t_{n-1}$,
- $\{x\}=x-\lfloor x \rfloor$ be the decimal part.

Tsirelson now defined the following drift

$$a[t,(X_s, s\leq t)]=\sum\limits_{n\in -\N}\bigg\{\frac{\Delta X_{t_n}}{\Delta t_n}\bigg\}1_{(t_n,t_{n+1}]}(t).$$

Let the expression

$$\eta_n=\xi_n+\{\eta_{n-1}\}$$

be the abbreviation for

$$\frac{\Delta X_{t_{n+1}}}{\Delta t_{n+1}}=\frac{\Delta W_{t_{n+1}}}{\Delta t_{ n+1}}+\bigg\{\frac{\Delta X_{t_n}}{\Delta t_n}\bigg\}.$$

=== Theorem ===
According to a theorem by Tsirelson and Yor:

1) The natural filtration of $X$ has the following decomposition

$$\mathcal{F}_t^{X}=\mathcal{F}_t^{W} \vee \sigma\big(\{\eta_{n-1}\}\big),\quad \forall t\geq 0, \quad \forall t_n\leq t$$

2) For each $n\in -\N$ the $\{\eta_n\}$ are uniformly distributed on $[0,1)$ and independent of $(W_t)_{t\geq 0}$ resp. $\mathcal{F}_{\infty}^{W}$.

3) $\mathcal{F}_{0+}^{X}$ is the $P$-trivial σ-algebra, i.e. all events have probability $0$ or $1$.

== See also ==
- Tanaka equation

== Literature ==
- Rogers, L. C. G.; Williams, David (2000). Diffusions, Markov Processes and Martingales: Volume 2, Itô Calculus. United Kingdom: Cambridge University Press. pp. 155–156.
