= Jean-Pierre Kahane =

French mathematician (1926–2017)

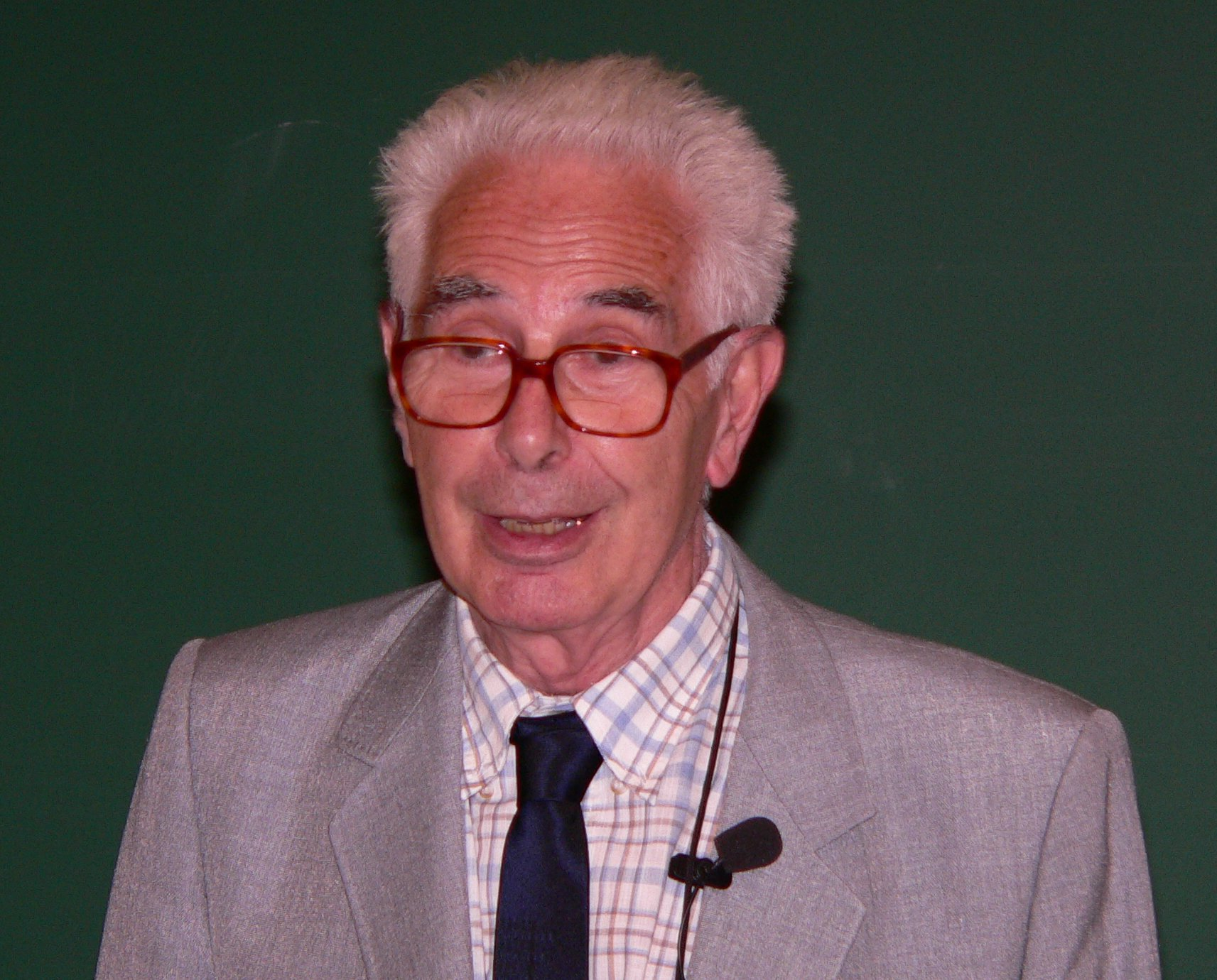
- Jean-Pierre Kahane in 2006
- Born: 11 December 1926; Paris
- Died: 21 June 2017 (aged 90); Paris
- Known for: Type and cotype
- Awards: Émile Picard Medal (1995); Prix de l'État (1980); ICM Speaker (1962, 1986); Peccot Lecture (1956/1957)
- Scientific career
- Fields: Mathematics
- Workplaces: University of Paris; University of Paris-Sud
- Doctoral advisor: Szolem Mandelbrojt
- Doctoral students: Jean-Pierre Aubin; Jean-Louis Krivine; Yves Meyer; Mario Wschebor

Jean-Pierre Kahane (11 December 1926 – 21 June 2017) was a French mathematician with contributions to harmonic analysis. He is also credited for introducing and formalizing the class of sub-gaussian random variables.

== Career ==
Kahane attended the École normale supérieure and obtained the agrégation of mathematics in 1949. He then worked for the CNRS from 1949 to 1954, first as an intern and then as a research assistant. He defended his PhD in 1954; his advisor was Szolem Mandelbrojt.

He was assistant professor, then professor of mathematics in Montpellier from 1954 to 1961. Since then, he has been professor until his retirement in 1994, then professor emeritus at the Université de Paris-Sud in Orsay.

He was a Plenary Speaker at the International Congress of Mathematicians in 1962 in Stockholm and an Invited Speaker at the 1986 ICM meeting in Berkeley, California. He was elected corresponding member of the French Academy of Sciences in 1982 and full member in 1998. He was president of the Société mathématique de France, the French Mathematical Society from 1971 to 1973. In 2000 Kahane received an honorary doctorate from the Faculty of Science and Technology at Uppsala University, Sweden In 2002 he was elevated to the rank of commander in the order of the Légion d'Honneur. In 2012 he became a fellow of the American Mathematical Society.

== Activism ==
Kahane was also known for his lifelong activism as part of the French Communist Party.

== Honors and Awards ==
- Grand Officer of the Order of Legion of Honour (2016)
- Commander of the Order of Legion of Honour (2012)
- Officer of the Order of Legion of Honour (1995)
- Knight of the Order of Legion of Honour (1985)

== Selected publications ==
- Lectures on mean periodic functions (Bombay, Tata Institute, 1959).
- Séries de Fourier absolument convergentes, Ergebnisse der Mathematik und ihrer Grenzgebiete, vol. 50, Springer Verlag 1970
- with Raphaël Salem: Ensembles parfaits et séries trigonométriques, Hermann, 1963, 1994
- Some random series of functions, Lexington, Massachusetts, D. C. Heath 1968, 2nd edition Cambridge University Press 1985
- Séries de Fourier aléatoires, Presse de l’ Université de Montreal 1967
- editor with A. G. Howson: The Popularization of Mathematics, Cambridge University Press 1990
- Des series de Taylor au movement brownien, avec un apercu sur le retour, in Jean-Paul Pier, Development of mathematics 1900–1950, Birkhäuser 1994
