= Type and cotype of a Banach space =

In functional analysis, the type and cotype of a Banach space are a classification of Banach spaces through probability theory and a measure for how far a Banach space is away from being a Hilbert space.

The starting point is the Pythagorean identity for orthogonal vectors $(e_k)_{k=1}^{n}$ in Hilbert spaces

$$\left\|\sum_{k=1}^n e_k \right\|^2 = \sum_{k=1}^n \left\|e_k\right\|^2.$$

This identity no longer holds in general Banach spaces; however, one can introduce a notion of orthogonality probabilistically with the help of Rademacher random variables, for this reason one also speaks of Rademacher type and Rademacher cotype.

The notion of type and cotype was introduced by French mathematician Jean-Pierre Kahane.

== Definition ==
Let

- $(X,\|\cdot\|)$ be a Banach space,
- $(\varepsilon_i)$ be a sequence of independent Rademacher random variables, i.e. $P(\varepsilon_i=-1)=P(\varepsilon_i=1)=1/2$ and $\mathbb{E}[\varepsilon_i\varepsilon_m]=0$ for $i\neq m$ and $\operatorname{Var}[\varepsilon_i]=1$.

The notation $\mathbb{E}_{\varepsilon}$ means that we integrate with respect to the variable $\varepsilon$.

=== Type ===
$X$ is of type $p$ for $p\in [1,2]$ if there exists a finite constant $C \geq 1$ such that

$$\mathbb{E}_{\varepsilon}\left[\left\|\sum\limits_{i=1}^n \varepsilon_i x_i \right\|^p\right]\leq C^p\left(\sum\limits_{i=1}^n \|x_i\|^p\right)$$

for all finite sequences $(x_i)_{i=1}^n \in X^{n}$. The sharpest constant $C$ is called type $p$ constant and denoted as $T_p(X)$.

=== Cotype ===
$X$ is of cotype $q$ for $q\in [2,\infty]$ if there exists a finite constant $C \geq 1$ such that

$$\mathbb{E}_{\varepsilon}\left[\left\|\sum\limits_{i=1}^n \varepsilon_i x_i\right\|^q \right]\geq \frac{1}{C^q}\left(\sum\limits_{i=1}^n \|x_i\|^q\right), \quad\text{if}\; 2\leq q <\infty$$

respectively

$$\mathbb{E}_{\varepsilon}\left[\left\|\sum\limits_{i=1}^n \varepsilon_i x_i\right\| \right]\geq \frac{1}{C}\sup\|x_i\|, \quad\text{if}\; q=\infty$$

for all finite sequences $(x_i)_{i=1}^n \in X^{n}$. The sharpest constant $C$ is called cotype $q$ constant and denoted as $C_q(X)$.

=== Remarks ===
By taking the $p$-th resp. $q$-th root one gets the equation for the Bochner $L^p$ norm.

== Properties ==
- Every Banach space is of type $1$ (follows from the triangle inequality).
- A Banach space is of type $2$ and cotype $2$ if and only if the space is also isomorphic to a Hilbert space.

If a Banach space:

- is of type $p$ then it is also type $p'\in [1,p]$.
- is of cotype $q$ then it is also of cotype $q'\in [q,\infty]$.
- is of type $p$ for $1<p\leq 2$, then its dual space $X^*$ is of cotype $p^*$ with $p^* :=(1-1/p)^{-1}$ (conjugate index). Further it holds that $C_{p^*}(X^*)\leq T_p(X)$

== Examples ==
- The $L^p$ spaces for $p\in [1,2]$ are of type $p$ and cotype $2$, this means $L^1$ is of type $1$, $L^2$ is of type $2$ and so on.
- The $L^p$ spaces for $p\in [2,\infty)$ are of type $2$ and cotype $p$.
- The space $L^{\infty}$ is of type $1$ and cotype $\infty$.

== Literature ==
- Li, Daniel; Queffélec, Hervé (2017). Introduction to Banach Spaces: Analysis and Probability. Cambridge Studies in Advanced Mathematics. Cambridge University Press. pp. 159–209. doi:10.1017/CBO9781316675762.009.
- Joseph Diestel (1984). Sequences and Series in Banach Spaces. Springer New York.
- Laurent Schwartz (2006). Geometry and Probability in Banach Spaces. Springer Berlin Heidelberg. ISBN 978-3-540-10691-3.
- Ledoux, Michel; Talagrand, Michel (1991). Probability in Banach Spaces. Ergebnisse der Mathematik und ihrer Grenzgebiete. Vol. 23. Berlin, Heidelberg: Springer. doi:10.1007/978-3-642-20212-4_11.
