= Tanaka equation =

In mathematics, Tanaka's equation is an example of a stochastic differential equation which admits a weak solution but has no strong solution. It is named after the Japanese mathematician Hiroshi Tanaka (Tanaka Hiroshi).

Tanaka's equation is the one-dimensional stochastic differential equation

$$\mathrm{d} X_t = \sgn (X_t) \, \mathrm{d} B_t,$$

driven by canonical Brownian motion B, with initial condition X_{0} = 0, where sgn denotes the sign function

$$\sgn (x) = \begin{cases} +1, & x \geq 0; \\ -1, & x < 0. \end{cases}$$

(Note the unconventional value for sgn(0).) The signum function does not satisfy the Lipschitz continuity condition required for the usual theorems guaranteeing existence and uniqueness of strong solutions. The Tanaka equation has no strong solution, i.e. one for which the version B of Brownian motion is given in advance and the solution X is adapted to the filtration generated by B and the initial conditions. However, the Tanaka equation does have a weak solution, one for which the process X and version of Brownian motion are both specified as part of the solution, rather than the Brownian motion being given a priori. In this case, simply choose X to be any Brownian motion and define $\tilde{B}$ by

$$\tilde{B}_t = \int_0^t \sgn \big( X_s \big) \, \mathrm{d} X_s,$$

i.e.

$$\mathrm{d} \tilde{B}_t = \sgn (X_t) \, \mathrm{d} X_t.$$

Hence,

$$\mathrm{d} X_t = \sgn (X_t) \, \mathrm{d} \tilde{B}_{t},$$

and so X is a weak solution of the Tanaka equation. Furthermore, this solution is weakly unique, i.e. any other weak solution must have the same law.

Another counterexample of this type is Tsirelson's stochastic differential equation.
