= Michel Ledoux =

French mathematician

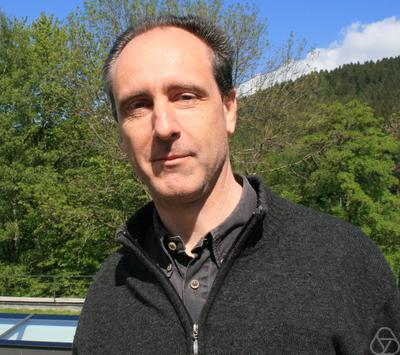
Ledoux at Oberwolfach in 2011

Michel Ledoux (born 1958) is a French mathematician, specializing in probability theory. He is a professor at the University of Toulouse.

Ledoux received in 1985 his PhD from the University of Strasbourg with thesis Propriétés limites des variables aléatoires vectorielles which was made under the supervision of Xavier Fernique.

He has done important research on the isoperimetric inequality in analysis and probability theory.

In 2010, he received the Servant Prize of the French Academy of Sciences. In 2014, he was an invited speaker at the International Congress of Mathematicians in Seoul and gave a talk Heat flows, geometric and functional inequalities.

== Selected publications ==
- Bakry, D.; Gentil, Ivan; Ledoux, Michel (2014). Analysis and Geometry of Markov Diffusion Operators. Cham. ISBN 978-3-319-00227-9. OCLC 863638322.
- Ledoux, Michel; Talagrand, Michel (1991). Probability in Banach Spaces : Isoperimetry and Processes. Berlin, Heidelberg: Springer Berlin Heidelberg. ISBN 978-3-642-20212-4. OCLC 851818740. 2nd edition 2002
- Ledoux, Michel (1996). "Isoperimetry and Gaussian analysis". Lecture Notes in Mathematics. Vol. 1648. Berlin, Heidelberg: Springer Berlin Heidelberg. pp. 165–294. doi:10.1007/bfb0095676. ISBN 978-3-540-62055-6. ISSN 0075-8434.
- Ledoux, Michel (2001). The concentration of measure phenomenon. Providence, R.I.: American Mathematical Society. ISBN 0-8218-2864-9. OCLC 47237544.
- Barbe, Philippe; Ledoux, Michel (2007). Probabilité. Les Ulis, France: EDP Sciences. ISBN 978-2-86883-931-2. OCLC 156827977.
