= Ildar Ibragimov (mathematician) =

Russian mathematician (born 1932)

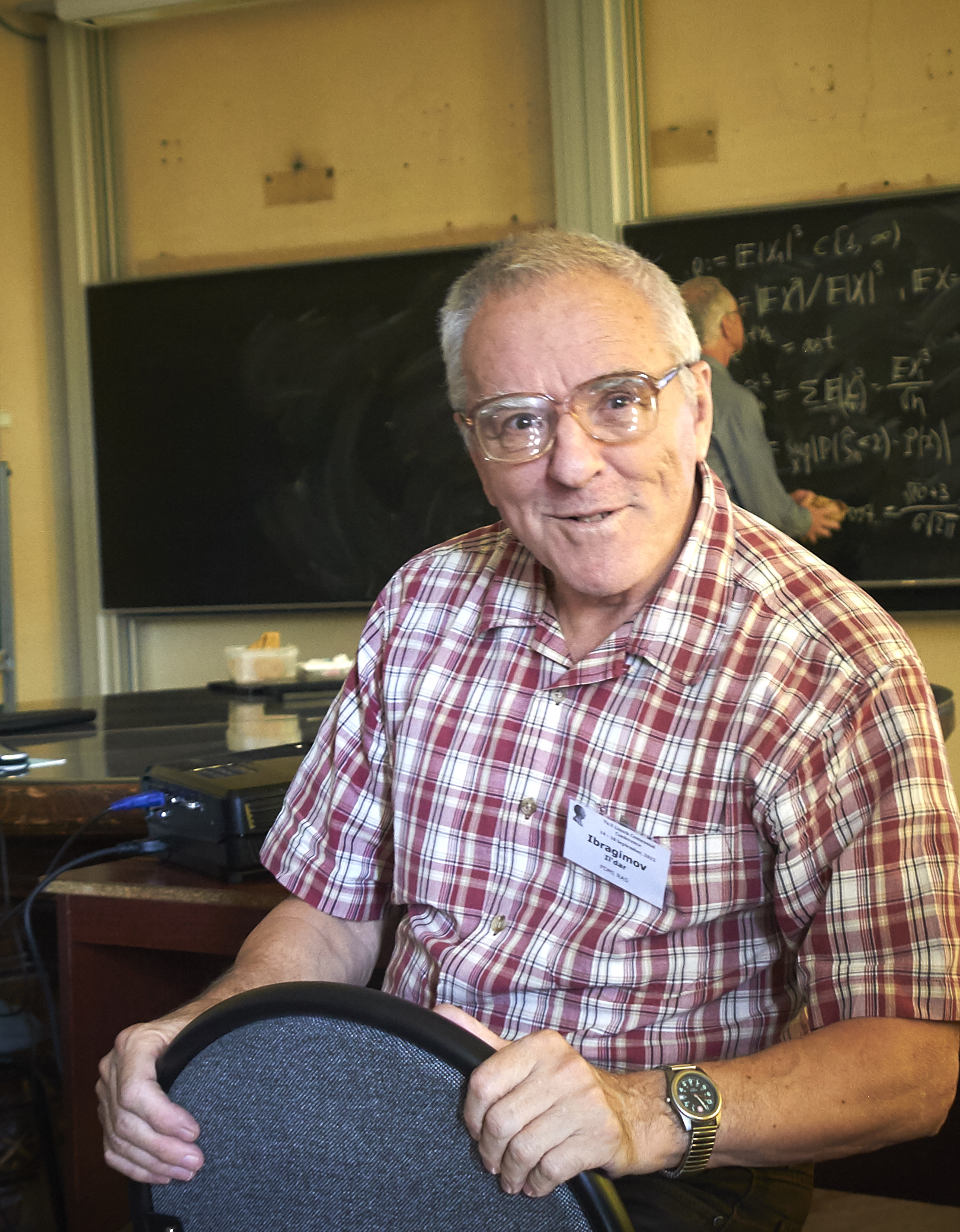
Ildar Abdulovich Ibragimov in 2015

Ildar Abdulovich Ibragimov (Ильдар Абдулович Ибрагимов, born 15 July 1932, Leningrad) is a Russian mathematician, specializing in probability theory and mathematical statistics.

== Biography ==
Ibragimov is the son of a father who was an engineer with Bashkir ancestry and a mother who was a physician from a Tatar family with origins in Kazan. Ildar Ibragimov studied at Leningrad State University, where he graduated in mathematics in 1956. He received in 1960 his Russian candidate degree (Ph.D.) under Yuri Linnik and in 1967 his Russian doctorate (higher doctoral degree). In 1969 he became a professor of probability at Leningrad State University.

He is a senior scientist and director of the laboratory of statistical methods at the Steklov Institute in Saint Petersburg, a position he has held there since 1972 as the successor to Yuri Linnik. Ibragimov was elected in 1990 a corresponding member and in 1997 a full member of the Russian Academy of Sciences. In 1970 he received the Lenin Prize. In 1989 he was the Wald Lecturer of the Institute of Mathematical Statistics. In 1966 in Moscow he was an Invited Speaker of the ICM.

His doctoral students include Taivo Arak and Boris Tsirelson.

== Selected publications ==
- with Linnik: Independent and stationary sequences of random variables, Groningen, Wolters-Noordhoff 1971
- with Y. A. Rozanov: Gaussian Random Processes, Springer Verlag 1978
- with R. Z. Hasminskii: Statistical estimation, asymptotic theory, Springer Verlag 1981
- as editor with A. Yu. Zaitzev: Probability theory and mathematical statistics, Gordon and Breach 1996
- as editor with N. Balakrishnan, V. B. Nevzorov: Asymptotic methods in probability and statistics with applications, Birkhäuser 2001
