= Distort (disambiguation) =

To distort is to alter the original shape of an object, image, sound, waveform or other form of information or representation.

Distort may also refer to:

- Distort (album), a 1998 industrial album by Collide
- Distort Entertainment, a record label

== See also ==
- Distortion (disambiguation)
