= Distortion (mathematics) =

In mathematics, the distortion is a measure of the amount by which a function from the Euclidean plane to itself distorts circles to ellipses. If the distortion of a function is equal to one, then it is conformal; if the distortion is bounded and the function is a homeomorphism, then it is quasiconformal. The distortion of a function ƒ of the plane is given by

$$H(z,f)  = \limsup_{r\to 0}\frac{\max_{|h|=r}|f(z+h)-f(z)|}{\min_{|h|=r}|f(z+h)-f(z)|}$$

which is the limiting eccentricity of the ellipse produced by applying ƒ to small circles centered at z. This geometrical definition is often very difficult to work with, and the necessary analytical features can be extrapolated to the following definition. A mapping ƒ : Ω → R^{2} from an open domain in the plane to the plane has finite distortion at a point x ∈ Ω if ƒ is in the Sobolev space W^{1,1}_{loc}(Ω, R^{2}), the Jacobian determinant J(x,ƒ) is locally integrable and does not change sign in Ω, and there is a measurable function K(x) ≥ 1 such that

$$|Df(x)|^2 \le K(x)|J(x,f)|$$

almost everywhere. Here Df is the weak derivative of ƒ, and |Df| is the Hilbert–Schmidt norm.

For functions on a higher-dimensional Euclidean space R^{n}, there are more measures of distortion because there are more than two principal axes of a symmetric tensor. The pointwise information is contained in the distortion tensor

$$G(x,f) =
\begin{cases}
|J(x,f)|^{-2/n}D^Tf(x)Df(x)&\text{if }J(x,f)\not=0\\
I &\text{if }J(x,f)=0.
\end{cases}$$

The outer distortion K_{O} and inner distortion K_{I} are defined via the Rayleigh quotients

$$K_O(x) = \sup_{\xi\not=0}\frac{\langle G(x)\xi,\xi\rangle^{n/2}}{|\xi|^n},\quad K_I(x) = \sup_{\xi\not=0}\frac{\langle G^{-1}(x)\xi,\xi\rangle^{n/2}}{|\xi|^n}.$$

The outer distortion can also be characterized by means of an inequality similar to that given in the two-dimensional case. If Ω is an open set in R^{n}, then a function ƒ ∈ W^{1,1}_{loc}(Ω,R^{n}) has finite distortion if its Jacobian is locally integrable and does not change sign, and there is a measurable function K_{O} (the outer distortion) such that

$$|Df(x)|^n \le K_O(x)|J(x,f)|$$

almost everywhere.

== See also ==
- Deformation (mechanics)
