= Deformation =

Deformation can refer to:

- Deformation (engineering), changes in an object's shape or form due to the application of a force or forces.
  - Deformation (physics), such changes considered and analyzed as displacements of continuum bodies.
- Deformation (meteorology), a measure of the rate at which the shapes of clouds and other fluid bodies change.
- Deformation (mathematics), the study of conditions leading to slightly different solutions of mathematical equations, models and problems.
- Deformation (volcanology), a measure of the rate at which the shapes of volcanoes change.
- Deformity, a major difference in the shape of a body part or organ compared to its common or average shape.

== See also ==
- Plasticity (physics), the study of the non-reversible deformation of materials subjected to forces.
- Super-deformed, or the chibi style of art associated with anime and manga
