= Banach–Mazur compactum =

Concept in functional analysis

In the mathematical study of functional analysis, the Banach–Mazur distance is a way to define a distance on the set $Q(n)$ of $n$-dimensional normed spaces. With this distance, the set of isometry classes of $n$-dimensional normed spaces becomes a compact metric space, called the Banach–Mazur compactum.

== Definitions ==
If $X$ and $Y$ are two finite-dimensional normed spaces with the same dimension, let $\operatorname{GL}(X, Y)$ denote the collection of all linear isomorphisms $T : X \to Y.$ Denote by $\|T\|$ the operator norm of such a linear map — the maximum factor by which it "lengthens" vectors. The Banach–Mazur distance between $X$ and $Y$ is defined by
$$\delta(X, Y) = \log \Bigl( \inf \left\{ \left\|T\right\| \left\|T^{-1}\right\| : T \in \operatorname{GL}(X, Y) \right\} \Bigr).$$

We have $\delta(X, Y) = 0$ if and only if the spaces $X$ and $Y$ are isometrically isomorphic. Equipped with the metric δ, the space of isometry classes of $n$-dimensional normed spaces becomes a compact metric space, called the Banach–Mazur compactum.

Many authors prefer to work with the multiplicative Banach–Mazur distance
$$d(X, Y) := \mathrm{e}^{\delta(X, Y)} = \inf \left\{ \left\|T\right\| \left\|T^{-1}\right\| : T \in \operatorname{GL}(X, Y) \right\},$$
for which $d(X, Z) \leq d(X, Y) \, d(Y, Z)$ and $d(X, X) = 1.$

== Properties ==
F. John's theorem on the maximal ellipsoid contained in a convex body gives the estimate:

$d(X, \ell_n^2) \le \sqrt{n}, \,$

where $\ell_n^2$ denotes $\R^n$ with the Euclidean norm (see the article on $L^p$ spaces).

From this it follows that $d(X, Y) \leq n$ for all $X, Y \in Q(n).$ However, for the classical spaces, this upper bound for the diameter of $Q(n)$ is far from being approached. For example, the distance between $\ell_n^1$ and $\ell_n^{\infty}$ is (only) of order $n^{1/2}$ (up to a multiplicative constant independent from the dimension $n$).

A major achievement in the direction of estimating the diameter of $Q(n)$ is due to E. Gluskin, who proved in 1981 that the (multiplicative) diameter of the Banach–Mazur compactum is bounded below by $c\,n,$ for some universal $c > 0.$

Gluskin's method introduces a class of random symmetric polytopes $P(\omega)$ in $\R^n,$ and the normed spaces $X(\omega)$ having $P(\omega)$ as unit ball (the vector space is $\R^n$ and the norm is the gauge of $P(\omega)$). The proof consists in showing that the required estimate is true with large probability for two independent copies of the normed space $X(\omega).$

$Q(2)$ is an absolute extensor. On the other hand, $Q(2)$ is not homeomorphic to a Hilbert cube.

== See also ==
- Compact space – Type of mathematical space
- General linear group – Group of 𝑛 × 𝑛 invertible matrices
