= Minkowski norm =

Minkowski norm may refer to:

- The proper length in Minkowski space
- The norm defined in the tangent bundle of a Finsler manifold
- The vector p-norm
- The norm defined by a Minkowski functional
