= Locally convex topological vector space =

Space with topology generated by convex sets

In functional analysis and related areas of mathematics, locally convex topological vector spaces (LCTVS) or locally convex spaces are examples of topological vector spaces (TVS) that generalize normed spaces. They can be defined as topological vector spaces whose topology is generated by translations of balanced, absorbent, convex sets. Alternatively they can be defined as a vector space with a family of seminorms, and a topology can be defined in terms of that family. Although in general such spaces are not necessarily normable, the existence of a convex local base for the zero vector is strong enough for the Hahn–Banach theorem to hold, yielding a sufficiently rich theory of continuous linear functionals.

Fréchet spaces are locally convex topological vector spaces that are completely metrizable (with a choice of complete metric). They are generalizations of Banach spaces, which are complete vector spaces with respect to a metric generated by a norm.

== History ==
Metrizable topologies on vector spaces have been studied since their introduction in Maurice Fréchet's 1906 PhD thesis Sur quelques points du calcul fonctionnel (wherein the notion of a metric was first introduced). After the notion of a general topological space was defined by Felix Hausdorff in 1914, although locally convex topologies were implicitly used by some mathematicians, up to 1934 only John von Neumann would seem to have explicitly defined the weak topology on Hilbert spaces and strong operator topology on operators on Hilbert spaces. Finally, in 1935 von Neumann introduced the general definition of a locally convex space (called a convex space by him).

A notable example of a result which had to wait for the development and dissemination of general locally convex spaces (amongst other notions and results, like nets, the product topology and Tychonoff's theorem) to be proven in its full generality, is the Banach–Alaoglu theorem which Stefan Banach first established in 1932 by an elementary diagonal argument for the case of separable normed spaces (in which case the unit ball of the dual is metrizable).

== Definition ==
Suppose $X$ is a vector space over $\mathbb{K},$ a subfield of the complex numbers (normally $\Complex$ itself or $\R$). A locally convex space is defined either in terms of convex sets, or equivalently in terms of seminorms.

=== Definition via convex sets ===
A topological vector space (TVS) is called locally convex if it has a neighborhood basis (that is, a local base) at the origin consisting of balanced, convex sets. The term locally convex topological vector space is sometimes shortened to locally convex space or LCTVS.

In fact, every locally convex TVS has a neighborhood basis of the origin consisting of absolutely convex sets (that is, disks), where this neighborhood basis can further be chosen to also consist entirely of open sets or entirely of closed sets. Every TVS has a neighborhood basis at the origin consisting of balanced sets, but only a locally convex TVS has a neighborhood basis at the origin consisting of sets that are both balanced and convex. It is possible for a TVS to have some neighborhoods of the origin that are convex and yet not be locally convex because it has no neighborhood basis at the origin consisting entirely of convex sets (that is, every neighborhood basis at the origin contains some non-convex set); for example, every non-locally convex TVS $X$ has itself (that is, $X$) as a convex neighborhood of the origin.

Because translation is continuous (by definition of topological vector space), all translations are homeomorphisms, so every base for the neighborhoods of the origin can be translated to a base for the neighborhoods of any given vector.

=== Definition via seminorms ===
A seminorm on $X$ is a map $p : X \to \R$ such that

1. $p$ is nonnegative or positive semidefinite: $p(x) \geq 0$;
2. $p$ is positive homogeneous or positive scalable: $p(s x) = |s| p(x)$ for every scalar $s.$ So, in particular, $p(0) = 0$;
3. $p$ is subadditive. It satisfies the triangle inequality: $p(x + y) \leq p(x) + p(y).$

If $p$ satisfies positive definiteness, which states that if $p(x) = 0$ then $x = 0,$ then $p$ is a norm. While seminorms need not be norms, there is an analogue of this criterion for families of seminorms—separatedness—defined below.

If $X$ is a vector space and $\mathcal{P}$ is a family of seminorms on $X$ then a subset $\mathcal{Q}$ of $\mathcal{P}$ is called a base of seminorms for $\mathcal{P}$ if for all $p \in \mathcal{P}$ there exists a $q \in \mathcal{Q}$ and a real $r > 0$ such that $p \leq r q.$

Definition (second version): A locally convex space is defined to be a vector space $X$ along with a family $\mathcal{P}$ of seminorms on $X.$

=== Seminorm topology ===
Suppose that $X$ is a vector space over $\mathbb{K},$ where $\mathbb{K}$ is either the real or complex numbers. A family of seminorms $\mathcal{P}$ on the vector space $X$ induces a canonical vector space topology on $X$, called the initial topology induced by the seminorms, making it into a topological vector space (TVS). By definition, it is the coarsest topology on $X$ for which all maps in $\mathcal{P}$ are continuous.

It is possible for a locally convex topology on a space $X$ to be induced by a family of norms but for $X$ to not be normable (that is, to have its topology be induced by a single norm).

=== Basis and subbases ===
An open set in $\mathbb{R}_{\geq0}$ has the form $[0, r)$, where $r$ is a positive real number. The family of preimages $p^{-1}\left([0,r)\right) = \{x \in X : p(x) < r\}$ as $p$ ranges over a family of seminorms $\mathcal{P}$ and $r$ ranges over the positive real numbers is a subbasis at the origin for the topology induced by $\mathcal{P}$. These sets are convex, as follows from properties 2 and 3 of seminorms. Intersections of finitely many such sets are then also convex, and since the collection of all such finite intersections is a basis at the origin it follows that the topology is locally convex in the sense of the first definition given above.

Recall that the topology of a TVS is translation invariant, meaning that if $S$ is any subset of $X$ containing the origin then for any $x \in X,$ $S$ is a neighborhood of the origin if and only if $x + S$ is a neighborhood of $x$; thus it suffices to define the topology at the origin. A base of neighborhoods of $y$ for this topology is obtained in the following way: for every finite subset $F$ of $\mathcal{P}$ and every $r > 0,$ let
$$U_{F, r}(y) := \{x \in X : p(x-y) < r \ \text{ for all } p \in F\}.$$

=== Bases of seminorms and saturated families ===
If $X$ is a locally convex space and if $\mathcal{P}$ is a collection of continuous seminorms on $X$, then $\mathcal{P}$ is called a base of continuous seminorms if it is a base of seminorms for the collection of all continuous seminorms on $X$. Explicitly, this means that for all continuous seminorms $p$ on $X$, there exists a $q \in \mathcal{P}$ and a real $r > 0$ such that $p \leq r q.$ If $\mathcal{P}$ is a base of continuous seminorms for a locally convex TVS $X$ then the family of all sets of the form $\{x \in X : q(x) < r\}$ as $q$ varies over $\mathcal{P}$ and $r$ varies over the positive real numbers, is a base of neighborhoods of the origin in $X$ (not just a subbasis, so there is no need to take finite intersections of such sets). (Note: Let $V_p = \{x \in X : p(x) < 1\}$ be the open unit ball associated with the seminorm $p$ and note that if $r > 0$ is real then $r V_p = \{r x \in X : p(x) < 1\} = \{z \in X : p(z) < r\} = \left\{x \in X : \tfrac{1}{r}p(x) < 1\right\} = V_{(1/r) p}$ and so $\tfrac{1}{r} V_p = V_{r p}.$ Thus a basic open neighborhood of the origin induced by $\mathcal{P}$ is a finite intersection of the form $V_{r_1 p_1} \cap \cdots \cap V_{r_n p_n}$ where $p_1, \ldots, p_n \in \mathcal{P}$ and $r_1, \ldots, r_n$ are all positive reals. Let $p := \max \left\{r_1 p_1, \ldots, r_n p_n\right\},$ which is a continuous seminorm and moreover, $V_p = V_{r_1 p_1} \cap \cdots \cap V_{r_n p_n}.$ Pick $r > 0$ and $q \in \mathcal{P}$ such that $p \leq r q,$ where this inequality holds if and only if $V_{r q} \subseteq V_p.$ Thus $\tfrac{1}{r} V_q = V_{r q} \subseteq V_p = V_{r_1 p_1} \cap \cdots \cap V_{r_n p_n},$ as desired.)

A family $\mathcal{P}$ of seminorms on a vector space $X$ is called saturated if for any $p$ and $q$ in $\mathcal{P},$ the seminorm defined by $x \mapsto \max \{ p(x), q(x) \}$ belongs to $\mathcal{P}.$

If $\mathcal{P}$ is a saturated family of continuous seminorms that induces the topology on $X$ then the collection of all sets of the form $\{x \in X : p(x) < r\}$ as $p$ ranges over $\mathcal{P}$ and $r$ ranges over all positive real numbers, forms a neighborhood basis at the origin consisting of convex open sets; This forms a basis at the origin rather than merely a subbasis so that in particular, there is no need to take finite intersections of such sets.

=== Basis of norms ===
The following theorem implies that if $X$ is a locally convex space then the topology of $X$ can be a defined by a family of continuous norms on $X$ (a norm is a seminorm $s$ where $s(x)=0$ implies $x=0$) if and only if there exists at least one continuous norm on $X$. This is because the sum of a norm and a seminorm is a norm so if a locally convex space is defined by some family $\mathcal{P}$ of seminorms (each of which is necessarily continuous) then the family $\mathcal{P} + n := \{p + n : p \in \mathcal{P}\}$ of (also continuous) norms obtained by adding some given continuous norm $n$ to each element, will necessarily be a family of norms that defines this same locally convex topology. If there exists a continuous norm on a topological vector space $X$ then $X$ is necessarily Hausdorff but the converse is not in general true (not even for locally convex spaces or Fréchet spaces).

Theorem—Let $X$ be a Fréchet space over the field $\mathbb{K}.$ Then the following are equivalent:

1. $X$ does not admit a continuous norm (that is, any continuous seminorm on $X$ can not be a norm).
2. $X$ contains a vector subspace that is TVS-isomorphic to $\mathbb{K}^{\N}.$
3. $X$ contains a complemented vector subspace that is TVS-isomorphic to $\mathbb{K}^{\N}.$

=== Nets ===
Suppose that the topology of a locally convex space $X$ is induced by a family $\mathcal{P}$ of continuous seminorms on $X$. If $x \in X$ and if $x_{\bull} = \left(x_i\right)_{i \in I}$ is a net in $X$, then $x_{\bull} \to x$ in $X$ if and only if for all $p \in \mathcal{P},$ $p\left(x_{\bull} - x\right) = \left(p\left(x_i - x\right)\right)_{i \in I} \to 0.$ Moreover, if $x_{\bull}$ is Cauchy in $X$, then so is $p\left(x_{\bull}\right) = \left(p\left(x_i\right)\right)_{i \in I}$ for every $p \in \mathcal{P}.$

=== Equivalence of definitions ===
Although the definition in terms of a neighborhood base gives a better geometric picture, the definition in terms of seminorms is easier to work with in practice. The equivalence of the two definitions follows from a construction known as the Minkowski functional or Minkowski gauge. The key feature of seminorms which ensures the convexity of their $\varepsilon$-balls is the triangle inequality.

For an absorbing set $C$ such that if $x \in C,$ then $t x \in C$ whenever $0 \leq t \leq 1,$ define the Minkowski functional of $C$ to be
$$\mu_C(x) = \inf \{r > 0: x \in r C\}.$$

From this definition it follows that $\mu_C$ is a seminorm if $C$ is balanced and convex (it is also absorbent by assumption). Conversely, given a family of seminorms, the sets
$$\left\{x : p_{\alpha_1}(x) < \varepsilon_1, \ldots, p_{\alpha_n}(x) < \varepsilon_n\right\}$$
form a base of convex absorbent balanced sets.

=== Ways of defining a locally convex topology ===
Theorem—Suppose that $X$ is a (real or complex) vector space and let $\mathcal{B}$ be a filter base of subsets of $X$ such that:

1. Every $B \in \mathcal{B}$ is convex, balanced, and absorbing;
2. For every $B \in \mathcal{B}$ there exists some real $r$ satisfying $0 < r \leq 1/2$ such that $r B \in \mathcal{B}.$

Then $\mathcal{B}$ is a neighborhood base at 0 for a locally convex TVS topology on $X.$

Theorem—Suppose that $X$ is a (real or complex) vector space and let $\mathcal{L}$ be a non-empty collection of convex, balanced, and absorbing subsets of $X.$ Then the set of all positive scalar multiples of finite intersections of sets in $\mathcal{L}$ forms a neighborhood base at the origin for a locally convex TVS topology on $X.$

Example: auxiliary normed spaces

If $W$ is convex and absorbing in $X$ then the symmetric set $D := \bigcap_{|u|=1} u W$ will be convex and balanced (also known as an absolutely convex set or a disk) in addition to being absorbing in $X.$ This guarantees that the Minkowski functional $p_D : X \to \R$ of $D$ will be a seminorm on $X,$ thereby making $\left(X, p_D\right)$ into a seminormed space that carries its canonical pseudometrizable topology. The set of scalar multiples $r D$ as $r$ ranges over $\left\{\tfrac{1}{2}, \tfrac{1}{3}, \tfrac{1}{4}, \ldots\right\}$ (or over any other set of non-zero scalars having $0$ as a limit point) forms a neighborhood basis of absorbing disks at the origin for this locally convex topology. If $X$ is a topological vector space and if this convex absorbing subset $W$ is also a bounded subset of $X,$ then the absorbing disk $D := \bigcap_{|u|=1} u W$ will also be bounded, in which case $p_D$ will be a norm and $\left(X, p_D\right)$ will form what is known as an auxiliary normed space. If this normed space is a Banach space then $D$ is called a Banach disk.

== Further definitions ==
- A family of seminorms $\left(p_{\alpha}\right)_{\alpha}$ is called total or separated or is said to separate points if whenever $p_{\alpha}(x) = 0$ holds for every $\alpha$ then $x$ is necessarily $0.$ A locally convex space is Hausdorff if and only if it has a separated family of seminorms. Many authors take the Hausdorff criterion in the definition.
- A pseudometric is a generalization of a metric which does not satisfy the condition that $d(x, y) = 0$ only when $x = y.$ A locally convex space is pseudometrizable, meaning that its topology arises from a pseudometric, if and only if it has a countable family of seminorms. Indeed, a pseudometric inducing the same topology is then given by
  $$d(x,y)=\sum^\infty_n \frac{1}{2^n} \frac{p_n(x-y)}{1+p_n(x-y)}$$
  (where the $1/2^n$ can be replaced by any positive summable sequence $a_n$). This pseudometric is translation-invariant, but not homogeneous, meaning $d(k x, k y) \neq |k| d(x, y),$ and therefore does not define a (pseudo)norm. The pseudometric is an honest metric if and only if the family of seminorms is separated, since this is the case if and only if the space is Hausdorff. If furthermore the space is complete, the space is called a Fréchet space.
- As with any topological vector space, a locally convex space is also a uniform space. Thus one may speak of uniform continuity, uniform convergence, and Cauchy sequences.
- A Cauchy net in a locally convex space is a net $\left(x_a\right)_{a \in A}$ such that for every $r > 0$ and every seminorm $p_\alpha,$ there exists some index $c \in A$ such that for all indices $a, b \geq c,$ $p_\alpha\left(x_a - x_b\right) < r.$ In other words, the net must be Cauchy in all the seminorms simultaneously. The definition of completeness is given here in terms of nets instead of the more familiar sequences because unlike Fréchet spaces which are metrizable, general spaces may be defined by an uncountable family of pseudometrics. Sequences, which are countable by definition, cannot suffice to characterize convergence in such spaces. A locally convex space is complete if and only if every Cauchy net converges.
- A family of seminorms becomes a preordered set under the relation $p_\alpha \leq p_\beta$ if and only if there exists an $M > 0$ such that for all $x,$ $p_\alpha(x) \leq M p_\beta(x).$ One says it is a directed family of seminorms if the family is a directed set with addition as the join, in other words if for every $\alpha$ and $\beta,$ there is a $\gamma$ such that $p_\alpha + p_\beta \leq p_\gamma.$ Every family of seminorms has an equivalent directed family, meaning one which defines the same topology. Indeed, given a family $\left(p_\alpha(x)\right)_{\alpha \in I},$ let $\Phi$ be the set of finite subsets of $I$ and then for every $F \in \Phi$ define
  $$q_F = \sum_{\alpha \in F} p_{\alpha}.$$
  One may check that $\left(q_F\right)_{F \in \Phi}$ is an equivalent directed family.
- If the topology of the space is induced from a single seminorm, then the space is seminormable. Any locally convex space with a finite family of seminorms is seminormable. Moreover, if the space is Hausdorff (the family is separated), then the space is normable, with norm given by the sum of the seminorms. In terms of the open sets, a locally convex topological vector space is seminormable if and only if the origin has a bounded neighborhood.

== Sufficient conditions ==
=== Hahn–Banach extension property ===
Let $X$ be a TVS. Say that a vector subspace $M$ of $X$ has the extension property if any continuous linear functional on $M$ can be extended to a continuous linear functional on $X$. Say that $X$ has the Hahn-Banach extension property (HBEP) if every vector subspace of $X$ has the extension property.

The Hahn-Banach theorem guarantees that every Hausdorff locally convex space has the HBEP. For complete metrizable TVSs there is a converse:

Theorem (Kalton)—Every complete metrizable TVS with the Hahn-Banach extension property is locally convex.

If a vector space $X$ has uncountable dimension and if we endow it with the finest vector topology then this is a TVS with the HBEP that is neither locally convex or metrizable.

== Properties ==
Throughout, $\mathcal{P}$ is a family of continuous seminorms that generate the topology of $X.$

Topological closure

If $S \subseteq X$ and $x \in X,$ then $x \in \operatorname{cl} S$ if and only if for every $r > 0$ and every finite collection $p_1, \ldots, p_n \in \mathcal{P}$ there exists some $s \in S$ such that $\sum_{i=1}^n p_i(x - s) < r.$ The closure of $\{0\}$ in $X$ is equal to $\bigcap_{p \in \mathcal{P}} p^{-1}(0).$

Topology of Hausdorff locally convex spaces

Every Hausdorff locally convex space is homeomorphic to a vector subspace of a product of Banach spaces. The Anderson–Kadec theorem states that every infinite–dimensional separable Fréchet space is homeomorphic to the product space $\prod_{i \in \N} \R$ of countably many copies of $\R$ (this homeomorphism need not be a linear map).

=== Properties of convex subsets ===
Algebraic properties of convex subsets

A subset $C$ is convex if and only if $t C + (1 - t) C \subseteq C$ for all $0 \leq t \leq 1$ or equivalently, if and only if $(s + t) C = s C + t C$ for all positive real $s > 0 \text{ and } t > 0,$ where because $(s + t) C \subseteq s C + t C$ always holds, the equals sign $\,=\,$ can be replaced with $\,\supseteq.\,$ If $C$ is a convex set that contains the origin then $C$ is star shaped at the origin and for all non-negative real $s \geq 0 \text{ and } t \geq 0,$ $(s C) \cap (t C) = (\min_{} \{s, t\}) C.$

The Minkowski sum of two convex sets is convex; furthermore, the scalar multiple of a convex set is again convex.

Topological properties of convex subsets

- Suppose that $Y$ is a TVS (not necessarily locally convex or Hausdorff) over the real or complex numbers. Then the open convex subsets of $Y$ are exactly those that are of the form $z + \{y \in Y : p(y) < 1\} = \{y \in Y : p(y - z) < 1\}$ for some $z \in Y$ and some positive continuous sublinear functional $p$ on $Y.$
- The interior and closure of a convex subset of a TVS is again convex.
- If $C$ is a convex set with non-empty interior, then the closure of $C$ is equal to the closure of the interior of $C$; furthermore, the interior of $C$ is equal to the interior of the closure of $C.$
  - So if the interior of a convex set $C$ is non-empty then $C$ is a closed (respectively, open) set if and only if it is a regular closed (respectively, regular open) set.
- If $C$ is convex and $0 < t \leq 1,$ then $t \operatorname{Int} C + (1 - t) \operatorname{cl} C ~\subseteq~ \operatorname{Int} C.$ Explicitly, this means that if $C$ is a convex subset of a TVS $X$ (not necessarily Hausdorff or locally convex), $y$ belongs to the closure of $C,$ and $x$ belongs to the interior of $C,$ then the open line segment joining $x$ and $y$ belongs to the interior of $C;$ that is, $\{t x + (1 - t) y : 0 < t < 1\} \subseteq \operatorname{int}_X C.$ (Note: Fix $0 < r < 1$ so it remains to show that $w_0 ~\stackrel{\scriptscriptstyle\text{def}}{=}~ r x + (1 - r) y$ belongs to $\operatorname{int}_X C.$ By replacing $C, x, y$ with $C - w_0, x - w_0, y - w_0$ if necessary, we may assume without loss of generality that $r x + (1 - r) y = 0,$ and so it remains to show that $C$ is a neighborhood of the origin. Let $s ~\stackrel{\scriptscriptstyle\text{def}}{=}~ \tfrac{r}{r - 1} < 0$ so that $y = \tfrac{r}{r - 1} x = s x.$ Since scalar multiplication by $s \neq 0$ is a linear homeomorphism $X \to X,$ $\operatorname{cl}_X \left(\tfrac{1}{s} C\right) = \tfrac{1}{s} \operatorname{cl}_X C.$ Since $x \in \operatorname{int} C$ and $y \in \operatorname{cl} C,$ it follows that $x = \tfrac{1}{s} y \in \operatorname{cl} \left(\tfrac{1}{s} C\right) \cap \operatorname{int} C$ where because $\operatorname{int} C$ is open, there exists some $c_0 \in \left(\tfrac{1}{s} C\right) \cap \operatorname{int} C,$ which satisfies $s c_0 \in C.$ Define $h : X \to X$ by $x \mapsto r x + (1 - r) s c_0 = r x - r c_0,$ which is a homeomorphism because $0 < r < 1.$ The set $h\left(\operatorname{int} C\right)$ is thus an open subset of $X$ that moreover contains $h(c_0) = r c_0 - r c_0 = 0.$ If $c \in \operatorname{int} C$ then $h(c) = r c + (1 - r) s c_0 \in C$ since $C$ is convex, $0 < r < 1,$ and $s c_0, c \in C,$ which proves that $h\left(\operatorname{int} C\right) \subseteq C.$ Thus $h\left(\operatorname{int} C\right)$ is an open subset of $X$ that contains the origin and is contained in $C.$ Q.E.D.)
- If $M$ is a closed vector subspace of a (not necessarily Hausdorff) locally convex space $X,$ $V$ is a convex neighborhood of the origin in $M,$ and if $z \in X$ is a vector not in $V,$ then there exists a convex neighborhood $U$ of the origin in $X$ such that $V = U \cap M$ and $z \not\in U.$
- The closure of a convex subset of a locally convex Hausdorff space $X$ is the same for all locally convex Hausdorff TVS topologies on $X$ that are compatible with duality between $X$ and its continuous dual space.
- In a locally convex space, the convex hull and the disked hull of a totally bounded set is totally bounded.
- In a complete locally convex space, the convex hull and the disked hull of a compact set are both compact.
  - More generally, if $K$ is a compact subset of a locally convex space, then the convex hull $\operatorname{co} K$ (respectively, the disked hull $\operatorname{cobal} K$) is compact if and only if it is complete.
- In a locally convex space, convex hulls of bounded sets are bounded. This is not true for TVSs in general.
- In a Fréchet space, the closed convex hull of a compact set is compact.
- In a locally convex space, any linear combination of totally bounded sets is totally bounded.

=== Properties of convex hulls ===
For any subset $S$ of a TVS $X,$ the convex hull (respectively, closed convex hull, balanced hull, convex balanced hull) of $S,$ denoted by $\operatorname{co} S$ (respectively, $\overline{\operatorname{co}} S,$ $\operatorname{bal} S,$ $\operatorname{cobal} S$), is the smallest convex (respectively, closed convex, balanced, convex balanced) subset of $X$ containing $S.$

- The convex hull of a compact subset of a Hilbert space is not necessarily closed and so also not necessarily compact. For example, let $H$ be the separable Hilbert space $\ell^2(\N)$ of square-summable sequences with the usual norm $\|\cdot\|_2$ and let $e_n = (0, \ldots, 0, 1, 0, \ldots)$ be the standard orthonormal basis (that is $1$ at the $n^{\text{th}}$-coordinate). The closed set $S = \{0\} \cup \left\{\tfrac{1}{1} e_1, \tfrac{1}{2} e_2, \tfrac{1}{3} e_3, \ldots\right\}$ is compact but its convex hull $\operatorname{co} S$ is not a closed set because $h := \sum_{n=1}^{\infty} \tfrac{1}{2^n} \tfrac{1}{n} e_n$ belongs to the closure of $\operatorname{co} S$ in $H$ but $h \not\in\operatorname{co} S$ (since every sequence $z \in \operatorname{co} S$ is a finite convex combination of elements of $S$ and so is necessarily $0$ in all but finitely many coordinates, which is not true of $h$). However, like in all complete Hausdorff locally convex spaces, the closed convex hull $K := \overline{\operatorname{co}} S$ of this compact subset is compact. The vector subspace $X := \operatorname{span} S$ is a pre-Hilbert space when endowed with the substructure that the Hilbert space $H$ induces on it but $X$ is not complete and $h \not\in C := K \cap X$ (since $h \not\in X$). The closed convex hull of $S$ in $X$ (here, "closed" means with respect to $X,$ and not to $H$ as before) is equal to $K \cap X,$ which is not compact (because it is not a complete subset). This shows that in a Hausdorff locally convex space that is not complete, the closed convex hull of compact subset might fail to be compact (although it will be precompact/totally bounded).
- In a Hausdorff locally convex space $X,$ the closed convex hull $\overline{\operatorname{co}}^X S = \operatorname{cl}_X \operatorname{co} S$ of compact subset $S$ is not necessarily compact although it is a precompact (also called "totally bounded") subset, which means that its closure, when taken in a completion $\widehat{X}$ of $X,$ will be compact (here $X \subseteq \widehat{X},$ so that $X = \widehat{X}$ if and only if $X$ is complete); that is to say, $\operatorname{cl}_{\widehat{X}} \overline{\operatorname{co}}^X S$ will be compact. So for example, the closed convex hull $C := \overline{\operatorname{co}}^X S$ of a compact subset of $S$ of a pre-Hilbert space $X$ is always a precompact subset of $X,$ and so the closure of $C$ in any Hilbert space $H$ containing $X$ (such as the Hausdorff completion of $X$ for instance) will be compact (this is the case in the previous example above).
- In a quasi-complete locally convex TVS, the closure of the convex hull of a compact subset is again compact.
- In a Hausdorff locally convex TVS, the convex hull of a precompact set is again precompact. Consequently, in a complete Hausdorff locally convex space, the closed convex hull of a compact subset is again compact.
- In any TVS, the convex hull of a finite union of compact convex sets is compact (and convex).
  - This implies that in any Hausdorff TVS, the convex hull of a finite union of compact convex sets is closed (in addition to being compact and convex); in particular, the convex hull of such a union is equal to the closed convex hull of that union.
  - In general, the closed convex hull of a compact set is not necessarily compact. However, every compact subset of $\Reals^n$ (where $n < \infty$) does have a compact convex hull.
  - In any non-Hausdorff TVS, there exist subsets that are compact (and thus complete) but not closed.
- The bipolar theorem states that the bipolar (that is, the polar of the polar) of a subset of a locally convex Hausdorff TVS is equal to the closed convex balanced hull of that set.
- The balanced hull of a convex set is not necessarily convex.
- If $C$ and $D$ are convex subsets of a topological vector space $X$ and if $x\in \operatorname{co} (C \cup D),$ then there exist $c \in C,$ $d \in D,$ and a real number $r$ satisfying $0 \leq r \leq 1$ such that $x = r c + (1 - r) d.$
- If $M$ is a vector subspace of a TVS $X,$ $C$ a convex subset of $M,$ and $D$ a convex subset of $X$ such that $D \cap M \subseteq C,$ then $C = M \cap \operatorname{co} (C \cup D).$
- Recall that the smallest balanced subset of $X$ containing a set $S$ is called the balanced hull of $S$ and is denoted by $\operatorname{bal} S.$ For any subset $S$ of $X,$ the convex balanced hull of $S,$ denoted by $\operatorname{cobal} S,$ is the smallest subset of $X$ containing $S$ that is convex and balanced. The convex balanced hull of $S$ is equal to the convex hull of the balanced hull of $S$ (i.e. $\operatorname{cobal} S = \operatorname{co} (\operatorname{bal} S)$), but the convex balanced hull of $S$ is not necessarily equal to the balanced hull of the convex hull of $S$ (that is, $\operatorname{cobal} S$ is not necessarily equal to $\operatorname{bal} (\operatorname{co} S)$).
- If $A, B \subseteq X$ are subsets of a TVS $X$ and if $s$ is a scalar then $\operatorname{co} (A + B) = \operatorname{co} (A) + \operatorname{co} (B),$ $\operatorname{co} (s A) = s \operatorname{co} A,$ $\operatorname{co} (A \cup B) = \operatorname{co} (A) \cup \operatorname{co} (B),$ and $\overline{\operatorname{co}}(s A) = s \overline{\operatorname{co}}(A).$ Moreover, if $\overline{\operatorname{co}}(A)$ is compact then $\overline{\operatorname{co}}(A + B) = \overline{\operatorname{co}}(A) + \overline{\operatorname{co}}(B).$ However, the convex hull of a closed set need not be closed; for example, the set $\left\{(x, \, \pm \tan x) : |x| < \tfrac{\pi}{2}\right\}$ is closed in $X := \R^2$ but its convex hull is the open set $\left(-\tfrac{\pi}{2}, \tfrac{\pi}{2}\right) \times \R.$
- If $A, B \subseteq X$ are subsets of a TVS $X$ whose closed convex hulls are compact, then $\overline{\operatorname{co}}(A \cup B) = \overline{\operatorname{co}}\left(\overline{\operatorname{co}}(A) \cup \overline{\operatorname{co}}(B)\right).$
- If $S$ is a convex set in a complex vector space $X$ and there exists some $z \in X$ such that $z, iz, -z, -iz \in S,$ then $r z + s i z \in S$ for all real $r, s$ such that $|r| + |s| \leq 1.$ In particular, $a z \in S$ for all scalars $a$ such that $|a|^2 \leq \tfrac{1}{2}.$
- Carathéodory's theorem: If $S$ is any subset of $\Reals^n$ (where $n < \infty$) then for every $x \in \operatorname{co} S,$ there exist a finite subset $F \subseteq S$ containing at most $n + 1$ points whose convex hull contains $x$ (that is, $|F| \leq n + 1$ and $x \in \operatorname{co} F$).

== Examples and nonexamples ==
=== Finest and coarsest locally convex topology ===
==== Coarsest vector topology ====
Any vector space $X$ endowed with the trivial topology (also called the indiscrete topology) is a locally convex TVS (and of course, it is the coarsest such topology). This topology is Hausdorff if and only $X = \{0\}.$ The indiscrete topology makes any vector space into a complete pseudometrizable locally convex TVS.

In contrast, the discrete topology forms a vector topology on $X$ if and only $X = \{0\}.$ This follows from the fact that every topological vector space is a connected space.

==== Finest locally convex topology ====
If $X$ is a real or complex vector space and if $\mathcal{P}$ is the set of all seminorms on $X$ then the locally convex TVS topology, denoted by $\tau_{\operatorname{lc}},$ that $\mathcal{P}$ induces on $X$ is called the finest locally convex topology on $X.$ This topology may also be described as the TVS-topology on $X$ having as a neighborhood base at the origin the set of all absorbing disks in $X.$ Any locally convex TVS-topology on $X$ is necessarily a subset of $\tau_{\operatorname{lc}}.$ $\left(X, \tau_{\operatorname{lc}}\right)$ is Hausdorff. Every linear map from $\left(X, \tau_{\operatorname{lc}}\right)$ into another locally convex TVS is necessarily continuous. In particular, every linear functional on $\left(X, \tau_{\operatorname{lc}}\right)$ is continuous and every vector subspace of $X$ is closed in $\left(X, \tau_{\operatorname{lc}}\right)$; therefore, if $X$ is infinite dimensional then $\left(X, \tau_{\operatorname{lc}}\right)$ is not pseudometrizable (and thus not metrizable). Moreover, $\tau_{\operatorname{lc}}$ is the only Hausdorff locally convex topology on $X$ with the property that any linear map from it into any Hausdorff locally convex space is continuous. The space $\left(X, \tau_{\operatorname{lc}}\right)$ is a bornological space.

=== Examples of locally convex spaces ===
Every normed space is a Hausdorff locally convex space, and much of the theory of locally convex spaces generalizes parts of the theory of normed spaces. The family of seminorms can be taken to be the single norm. Every Banach space is a complete Hausdorff locally convex space, in particular, the $L^p$ spaces with $p \geq 1$ are locally convex.

More generally, every Fréchet space is locally convex. A Fréchet space can be defined as a complete locally convex space with a separated countable family of seminorms.

The space $\R^{\omega}$ of real valued sequences with the family of seminorms given by
$$p_i \left(\left\{x_n\right\}_n\right) = \left|x_i\right|, \qquad i \in \N$$
is locally convex. The countable family of seminorms is complete and separable, so this is a Fréchet space, which is not normable. This is also the limit topology of the spaces $\R^n,$ embedded in $\R^{\omega}$ in the natural way, by completing finite sequences with infinitely many $0.$

Given any vector space $X$ and a collection $F$ of linear functionals on it, $X$ can be made into a locally convex topological vector space by giving it the weakest topology making all linear functionals in $F$ continuous. This is known as the weak topology or the initial topology determined by $F.$ The collection $F$ may be the algebraic dual of $X$ or any other collection. The family of seminorms in this case is given by $p_f(x) = |f(x)|$ for all $f$ in $F.$

Spaces of differentiable functions give other non-normable examples. Consider the space of smooth functions $f : \R^n \to \Complex$ such that $\sup_x \left|x^a D_b f\right| < \infty,$ where $a$ and $B$ are multiindices. The family of seminorms defined by $p_{a,b}(f) = \sup_x \left|x^a D_b f(x)\right|$ is separated, and countable, and the space is complete, so this metrizable space is a Fréchet space. It is known as the Schwartz space, or the space of functions of rapid decrease, and its dual space is the space of tempered distributions.

An important function space in functional analysis is the space $D(U)$ of smooth functions with compact support in $U \subseteq \R^n.$ A more detailed construction is needed for the topology of this space because the space $C_0^{\infty}(U)$ is not complete in the uniform norm. The topology on $D(U)$ is defined as follows: for any fixed compact set $K \subseteq U,$ the space $C_0^{\infty}(K)$ of functions $f \in C_0^{\infty}$ with $\operatorname{supp}(f) \subseteq K$ is a Fréchet space with countable family of seminorms $\|f\|_m = \sup_{k \leq m} \sup_x \left|D^k f(x)\right|$ (these are actually norms, and the completion of the space $C_0^{\infty}(K)$ with the $\| \cdot \|_m$ norm is a Banach space $D^m(K)$). Given any collection $\left(K_a\right)_{a\in A}$ of compact sets, directed by inclusion and such that their union equal $U,$ the $C_0^{\infty}\left(K_a\right)$ form a direct system, and $D(U)$ is defined to be the limit of this system. Such a limit of Fréchet spaces is known as an LF space. More concretely, $D(U)$ is the union of all the $C_0^{\infty}\left(K_a\right)$ with the strongest locally convex topology which makes each inclusion map $C_0^{\infty}\left(K_a\right) \hookrightarrow D(U)$ continuous. This space is locally convex and complete. However, it is not metrizable, and so it is not a Fréchet space. The dual space of $D\left(\R^n\right)$ is the space of distributions on $\R^n.$

More abstractly, given a topological space $X,$ the space $C(X)$ of continuous (not necessarily bounded) functions on $X$ can be given the topology of uniform convergence on compact sets. This topology is defined by semi-norms $\varphi_K(f) = \max \{|f(x)| : x \in K\}$ (as $K$ varies over the directed set of all compact subsets of $X$). When $X$ is locally compact (for example, an open set in $\R^n$) the Stone–Weierstrass theorem applies—in the case of real-valued functions, any subalgebra of $C(X)$ that separates points and contains the constant functions (for example, the subalgebra of polynomials) is dense.

=== Examples of spaces lacking local convexity ===
Many topological vector spaces are locally convex. Examples of spaces that lack local convexity include the following:

- The spaces $L^p([0, 1])$ for $0 < p < 1$ are equipped with the F-norm
  $$\|f\|^p_p = \int_0^1 |f(x)|^p \, dx.$$
  They are not locally convex, since the only convex neighborhood of zero is the whole space. More generally the spaces $L^p(\mu)$ with an atomless, finite measure $\mu$ and $0 < p < 1$ are not locally convex.
- The space of measurable functions on the unit interval $[0, 1]$ (where we identify two functions that are equal almost everywhere) has a vector-space topology defined by the translation-invariant metric (which induces the convergence in measure of measurable functions; for random variables, convergence in measure is convergence in probability):
  $$d(f, g) = \int_0^1 \frac{|f(x) - g(x)|}{1+|f(x) - g(x)|} \, dx.$$
  This space is often denoted $L_0.$

Both examples have the property that any continuous linear map to the real numbers is $0.$ In particular, their dual space is trivial, that is, it contains only the zero functional.

- The sequence space $\ell^p(\N),$ $0 < p < 1,$ is not locally convex.

== Continuous mappings ==
Theorem—Let $T : X \to Y$ be a linear operator between TVSs where $Y$ is locally convex (note that $X$ need not be locally convex). Then $T$ is continuous if and only if for every continuous seminorm $q$ on $Y$, there exists a continuous seminorm $p$ on $X$ such that $q \circ T \leq p.$

Because locally convex spaces are topological spaces as well as vector spaces, the natural functions to consider between two locally convex spaces are continuous linear maps. Using the seminorms, a necessary and sufficient criterion for the continuity of a linear map can be given that closely resembles the more familiar boundedness condition found for Banach spaces.

Given locally convex spaces $X$ and $Y$ with families of seminorms $\left(p_\alpha\right)_{\alpha}$ and $\left(q_\beta\right)_{\beta}$ respectively, a linear map $T : X \to Y$ is continuous if and only if for every $\beta,$ there exist $\alpha_1, \ldots, \alpha_n$ and $M > 0$ such that for all $v \in X,$
$$q_\beta(Tv) \leq M \left(p_{\alpha_1}(v) +\dotsb+p_{\alpha_n}(v)\right).$$

In other words, each seminorm of the range of $T$ is bounded above by some finite sum of seminorms in the domain. If the family $\left(p_\alpha\right)_{\alpha}$ is a directed family, and it can always be chosen to be directed as explained above, then the formula becomes even simpler and more familiar:
$$q_\beta(Tv) \leq Mp_\alpha(v).$$

The class of all locally convex topological vector spaces forms a category with continuous linear maps as morphisms.

=== Linear functionals ===
Theorem—If $X$ is a TVS (not necessarily locally convex) and if $f$ is a linear functional on $X$, then $f$ is continuous if and only if there exists a continuous seminorm $p$ on $X$ such that $|f| \leq p.$

If $X$ is a real or complex vector space, $f$ is a linear functional on $X$, and $p$ is a seminorm on $X$, then $|f| \leq p$ if and only if $f \leq p.$ If $f$ is a non-0 linear functional on a real vector space $X$ and if $p$ is a seminorm on $X$, then $f \leq p$ if and only if $f^{-1}(1) \cap \{x \in X : p(x) < 1\} = \varnothing.$

=== Multilinear maps ===
Let $n \geq 1$ be an integer, $X_1, \ldots, X_n$ be TVSs (not necessarily locally convex), let $Y$ be a locally convex TVS whose topology is determined by a family $\mathcal{Q}$ of continuous seminorms, and let $M : \prod_{i=1}^n X_i \to Y$ be a multilinear operator that is linear in each of its $n$ coordinates. The following are equivalent:

1. $M$ is continuous.
2. For every $q \in \mathcal{Q},$ there exist continuous seminorms $p_1, \ldots, p_n$ on $X_1, \ldots, X_n,$ respectively, such that $q(M(x)) \leq p_1\left(x_1\right) \cdots p_n\left(x_n\right)$ for all $x = \left(x_1, \ldots, x_n\right) \in \prod_{i=1}^n X_i.$
3. For every $q \in \mathcal{Q},$ there exists some neighborhood of the origin in $\prod_{i=1}^{n} X_{i}$ on which $q \circ M$ is bounded.

== See also ==
- Convex metric space – Type of metric space in mathematics
- Krein–Milman theorem – On when a space equals the closed convex hull of its extreme points
- Linear form – Linear map from a vector space to its field of scalars
- Locally convex vector lattice
- Minkowski functional – Function made from a set
- Seminorm – Mathematical function
- Sublinear functional – Type of function in linear algebra
- Topological group – Group that is a topological space with continuous group operations
- Topological vector space – Vector space with a notion of nearness
- Vector space – Algebraic structure in linear algebra
