= Sublinear function =

Type of function in linear algebra

In linear algebra, a sublinear function (or functional as is more often used in functional analysis), also called a quasi-seminorm, on a vector space is a real-valued function with some of the properties of a seminorm. Unlike seminorms, a sublinear function does not have to be nonnegative-valued and also does not have to be absolutely homogeneous. Seminorms are themselves abstractions of the more well known notion of norms, where a seminorm has all the defining properties of a norm except that it is not required to map non-zero vectors to non-zero values.

In functional analysis the name Banach functional is sometimes used, reflecting that they are most commonly used when applying a general formulation of the Hahn–Banach theorem. The notion of a sublinear function was introduced by Stefan Banach when he proved the Hahn-Banach theorem.

There is also a different notion in computer science, described below, that also goes by the name "sublinear function."

== Definitions ==
Let $X$ be a vector space over a field $\mathbb{K},$ where $\mathbb{K}$ is either the real numbers $\Reals$ or complex numbers $\C.$ A function $p \colon X \to \mathbb{R}$ is called sublinear if it has these two properties:

1. Positive homogeneity, that is $p(r x) = r p(x)$, for all $r \geq 0$ and $x \in X$.
2. Subadditivity, that is $p(x + y) \leq p(x) + p(y)$ for $x, y \in X.$

A function $p : X \to \Reals$ is called positive or nonnegative if $p(x) \geq 0$ for all $x \in X,$ although some authors define positive to instead mean that $p(x) \neq 0$ whenever $x \neq 0;$ these definitions are not equivalent. It is a symmetric function if $p(-x) = p(x)$ for all $x \in X.$ Every subadditive symmetric function is necessarily nonnegative. (Note: Let $x \in X.$ The triangle inequality and symmetry imply $p(0) = p(x + (- x)) \leq p(x) + p(-x) = p(x) + p(x) = 2 p(x).$ Substituting $0$ for $x$ and then subtracting $p(0)$ from both sides proves that $0 \leq p(0).$ Thus $0 \leq p(0) \leq 2 p(x)$ which implies $0 \leq p(x).$ $\blacksquare$) A sublinear function on a real vector space is symmetric if and only if it is a seminorm. A sublinear function on a real or complex vector space is a seminorm if and only if it is a balanced function or equivalently, if and only if $p(u x) \leq p(x)$ for every unit length scalar $u$ and $x \in X.$

The set of all sublinear functions on $X,$ denoted by $X^{\#},$ can be partially ordered by declaring $p \leq q$ if and only if $p(x) \leq q(x)$ for all $x \in X.$ A sublinear function is called minimal if it is a minimal element of $X^{\#}$ under this order. A sublinear function is minimal if and only if it is a real linear functional.

== Examples and sufficient conditions ==
Every norm, seminorm, and real linear functional is a sublinear function. The identity function on $\Reals$ is an example of a sublinear function (in fact, it is even a linear functional) that is neither positive nor a seminorm; the same is true of this map's negation $x \mapsto -x.$ More generally, for any real $a \leq b,$ the map

$$S_{a,b} \colon \Reals \to \Reals, \quad
x \mapsto
\begin{cases}
a x, & \text{if } x \leq 0, \\
b x, & \text{if } x \geq 0
\end{cases}$$

is a sublinear function on $\Reals$ and moreover, every sublinear function $p \colon \Reals \to \Reals$ is of this form; specifically, if $a = -p(-1)$ and $b = p(1)$ then $a \leq b$ and $p = S_{a, b}.$

If $p$ and $q$ are sublinear functions on a real vector space $X$ then so is the map $x \mapsto \max \{p(x), q(x)\}.$ More generally, if $\mathcal{P}$ is any non-empty collection of sublinear functionals on a real vector space $X$ and if for all $x \in X,$ $q(x) = \sup \{p(x) \,;\, p \in \mathcal{P}\},$ then $q$ is a sublinear functional on $X.$

A function $p \colon X \to \Reals$ which is subadditive, convex, and satisfies $p(0) \leq 0$ is also positively homogeneous (the latter condition $p(0) \leq 0$ is necessary as the example of $p(x)=\sqrt{x^2+1}$ on $X=\mathbb R$ shows). If $p$ is positively homogeneous, it is convex if and only if it is subadditive. Therefore, assuming $p(0) \leq 0$, any two properties among subadditivity, convexity, and positive homogeneity implies the third.

== Properties ==
Every sublinear function is a convex function: For $0 \leq t \leq 1,$
$$\begin{alignat}{3}
p(t x + (1 - t) y)
&\leq p(t x) + p((1 - t) y) && \quad\text{ subadditivity} \\
&= t p(x) + (1 - t) p(y) && \quad\text{ nonnegative homogeneity} \\
\end{alignat}$$

If $p : X \to \Reals$ is a sublinear function on a vector space $X$ then (Note: If $x \in X$ and $r := 0$ then nonnegative homogeneity implies that $p(0) = p(r x) = r p(x) = 0 p(x) = 0.$ Consequently, $0 = p(0) = p(x + (-x)) \leq p(x) + p(-x),$ which is only possible if $0 \leq \max \{p(x), p(-x)\}.$ $\blacksquare$)
$$p(0) ~=~ 0 ~\leq~ p(x) + p(-x),$$
for every $x \in X,$ which implies that at least one of $p(x)$ and $p(-x)$ must be nonnegative; that is, for every $x \in X,$
$$0 ~\leq~ \max \{p(x), p(-x)\}.$$
Moreover, when $p : X \to \Reals$ is a sublinear function on a real vector space then the map $q : X \to \Reals$ defined by $q(x) ~\stackrel{\scriptscriptstyle\text{def}}{=}~ \max \{p(x), p(-x)\}$ is a seminorm.

Subadditivity of $p : X \to \Reals$ guarantees that for all vectors $x, y \in X,$ (Note: $p(x) = p(y + (x - y)) \leq p(y) + p(x - y),$ which happens if and only if $p(x) - p(y) \leq p(x - y).$ $\blacksquare$ Substituting $y := -x$ and gives $p(x) - p(-x) \leq p(x - (-x)) = p(x + x) \leq p(x) + p(x),$ which implies $- p(-x) \leq p(x)$ (positive homogeneity is not needed; the triangle inequality suffices). $\blacksquare$)
$$p(x) - p(y) ~\leq~ p(x - y),$$
$$- p(x) ~\leq~ p(-x),$$
so if $p$ is also symmetric then the reverse triangle inequality will hold for all vectors $x, y \in X,$
$$|p(x) - p(y)| ~\leq~ p(x - y).$$

Defining $\ker p ~\stackrel{\scriptscriptstyle\text{def}}{=}~ p^{-1}(0),$ then subadditivity also guarantees that for all $x \in X,$ the value of $p$ on the set $x + (\ker p \cap -\ker p) = \{x + k : p(k) = 0 = p(-k)\}$ is constant and equal to $p(x).$ (Note: Let $x \in X$ and $k \in p^{-1}(0) \cap (-p^{-1}(0)).$ It remains to show that $p(x + k) = p(x).$ The triangle inequality implies $p(x + k) \leq p(x) + p(k) = p(x) + 0 = p(x).$ Since $p(-k) = 0,$ $p(x) = p(x) - p(-k) \leq p(x - (-k)) = p(x + k),$ as desired. $\blacksquare$) In particular, if $\ker p = p^{-1}(0)$ is a vector subspace of $X$ then $- \ker p = \ker p$ and the assignment $x + \ker p \mapsto p(x),$ which will be denoted by $\hat{p},$ is a well-defined real-valued sublinear function on the quotient space $X \,/\, \ker p$ that satisfies $\hat{p} ^{-1}(0) = \ker p.$ If $p$ is a seminorm then $\hat{p}$ is just the usual canonical norm on the quotient space $X \,/\, \ker p.$

Pryce's sublinearity lemma—Suppose $p : X \to \Reals$ is a sublinear functional on a vector space $X$ and that $K \subseteq X$ is a non-empty convex subset. If $x \in X$ is a vector and $a, c > 0$ are positive real numbers such that
$$p(x) + a c ~<~ \inf_{k \in K} p(x + a k)$$
then for every positive real $b > 0$ there exists some $\mathbf{z} \in K$ such that
$$p(x + a \mathbf{z}) + b c ~<~ \inf_{k \in K} p(x + a \mathbf{z} + b k).$$

Adding $b c$ to both sides of the hypothesis $p(x) + a c \,<\, \inf_{} p(x + a K)$ (where $p(x + a K) ~\stackrel{\scriptscriptstyle\text{def}}{=}~ \{p(x + a k) : k \in K\}$) and combining that with the conclusion gives
$$p(x) + a c + b c ~<~ \inf_{} p(x + a K) + b c ~\leq~ p(x + a \mathbf{z}) + b c ~<~ \inf_{} p(x + a \mathbf{z} + b K)$$
which yields many more inequalities, including, for instance,
$$p(x) + a c + b c ~<~ p(x + a \mathbf{z}) + b c ~<~ p(x + a \mathbf{z} + b \mathbf{z})$$
in which an expression on one side of a strict inequality $\,<\,$ can be obtained from the other by replacing the symbol $c$ with $\mathbf{z}$ (or vice versa) and moving the closing parenthesis to the right (or left) of an adjacent summand (all other symbols remain fixed and unchanged).

=== Associated seminorm ===
If $p : X \to \Reals$ is a real-valued sublinear function on a real vector space $X$ (or if $X$ is complex, then when it is considered as a real vector space) then the map $q(x) ~\stackrel{\scriptscriptstyle\text{def}}{=}~ \max \{p(x), p(-x)\}$ defines a seminorm on the real vector space $X$ called the seminorm associated with $p.$ A sublinear function $p$ on a real or complex vector space is a symmetric function if and only if $p = q$ where $q(x) ~\stackrel{\scriptscriptstyle\text{def}}{=}~ \max \{p(x), p(-x)\}$ as before.

More generally, if $p : X \to \Reals$ is a real-valued sublinear function on a (real or complex) vector space $X$ then
$$q(x) ~\stackrel{\scriptscriptstyle\text{def}}{=}~ \sup_{|u|=1} p(u x) ~=~ \sup \{p(u x) : u \text{ is a unit scalar }\}$$
will define a seminorm on $X$ if this supremum is always a real number (that is, never equal to $\infty$).

=== Relation to linear functionals ===
If $p$ is a sublinear function on a real vector space $X$ then the following are equivalent:

1. $p$ is a linear functional.
2. for every $x \in X,$ $p(x) + p(-x) \leq 0.$
3. for every $x \in X,$ $p(x) + p(-x) = 0.$
4. $p$ is a minimal sublinear function.

If $p$ is a sublinear function on a real vector space $X$ then there exists a linear functional $f$ on $X$ such that $f \leq p.$

If $X$ is a real vector space, $f$ is a linear functional on $X,$ and $p$ is a positive sublinear function on $X,$ then $f \leq p$ on $X$ if and only if $f^{-1}(1) \cap \{x \in X : p(x) < 1\} = \varnothing.$

==== Dominating a linear functional ====
A real-valued function $f$ defined on a subset of a real or complex vector space $X$ is said to be dominated by a sublinear function $p$ if $f(x) \leq p(x)$ for every $x$ that belongs to the domain of $f.$ If $f : X \to \Reals$ is a real linear functional on $X$ then $f$ is dominated by $p$ (that is, $f \leq p$) if and only if
$$-p(-x) \leq f(x) \leq p(x) \quad \text{ for every } x \in X.$$
Moreover, if $p$ is a seminorm or some other symmetric map (which by definition means that $p(-x) = p(x)$ holds for all $x$) then $f \leq p$ if and only if $|f| \leq p.$

Theorem—If $p : X \to \Reals$ be a sublinear function on a real vector space $X$ and if $z \in X$ then there exists a linear functional $f$ on $X$ that is dominated by $p$ (that is, $f \leq p$) and satisfies $f(z) = p(z).$ Moreover, if $X$ is a topological vector space and $p$ is continuous at the origin then $f$ is continuous.

=== Continuity ===
Theorem—Suppose $f : X \to \Reals$ is a subadditive function (that is, $f(x + y) \leq f(x) + f(y)$ for all $x, y \in X$). Then $f$ is continuous at the origin if and only if $f$ is uniformly continuous on $X.$ If $f$ satisfies $f(0) = 0$ then $f$ is continuous if and only if its absolute value $|f| : X \to [0, \infty)$ is continuous. If $f$ is non-negative then $f$ is continuous if and only if $\{x \in X : f(x) < 1\}$ is open in $X.$

Suppose $X$ is a topological vector space (TVS) over the real or complex numbers and $p$ is a sublinear function on $X.$ Then the following are equivalent:

1. $p$ is continuous;
2. $p$ is continuous at 0;
3. $p$ is uniformly continuous on $X$;

and if $p$ is positive then this list may be extended to include:

4. $\{x \in X : p(x) < 1\}$ is open in $X.$

If $X$ is a real TVS, $f$ is a linear functional on $X,$ and $p$ is a continuous sublinear function on $X,$ then $f \leq p$ on $X$ implies that $f$ is continuous.

=== Relation to Minkowski functions and open convex sets ===
Theorem—If $U$ is a convex open neighborhood of the origin in a topological vector space $X$ then the Minkowski functional of $U,$ $p_U : X \to [0, \infty),$ is a continuous non-negative sublinear function on $X$ such that $U = \left\{x \in X : p_U(x) < 1\right\};$ if in addition $U$ is a balanced set then $p_U$ is a seminorm on $X.$

==== Relation to open convex sets ====
Theorem—Suppose that $X$ is a topological vector space (not necessarily locally convex or Hausdorff) over the real or complex numbers. Then the open convex subsets of $X$ are exactly those that are of the form
$$z + \{x \in X : p(x) < 1\} = \{x \in X : p(x - z) < 1\}$$
for some $z \in X$ and some positive continuous sublinear function $p$ on $X.$

Proof

Let $V$ be an open convex subset of $X.$ If $0 \in V$ then let $z := 0$ and otherwise let $z \in V$ be arbitrary. Let $p : X \to [0, \infty)$ be the Minkowski functional of $V - z,$ which is a continuous sublinear function on $X$ since $V - z$ is convex, absorbing, and open ($p$ however is not necessarily a seminorm since $V$ was not assumed to be balanced). From $X = X - z,$ it follows that
$$z + \{x \in X : p(x) < 1\} = \{x \in X : p(x - z) < 1\}.$$
It will be shown that $V = z + \{x \in X : p(x) < 1\},$ which will complete the proof. One of the known properties of Minkowski functionals guarantees $\{x \in X : p(x) < 1\} = (0, 1)(V - z),$ where $(0, 1)(V - z) \;\stackrel{\scriptscriptstyle\text{def}}{=}\; \{t x : 0 < t < 1, x \in V - z\} = V - z$ since $V - z$ is convex and contains the origin. Thus $V - z = \{x \in X : p(x) < 1\},$ as desired. $\blacksquare$

== Operators ==
The concept can be extended to operators that are homogeneous and subadditive. This requires only that the codomain be, say, an ordered vector space to make sense of the conditions.

== Computer science definition ==
In computer science, a function $f : \Z^+ \to \Reals$ is called sublinear if $\lim_{n \to \infty} \frac{f(n)}{n} = 0,$ or $f(n) \in o(n)$ in asymptotic notation (notice the small $o$). Formally, $f(n) \in o(n)$ if and only if, for any given $c > 0,$ there exists an $N$ such that $f(n) < c n$ for $n \geq N.$ That is, $f$ grows slower than any linear function. The two meanings should not be confused: while a Banach functional is convex, almost the opposite is true for functions of sublinear growth: every function $f(n) \in o(n)$ can be upper-bounded by a concave function of sublinear growth.

== See also ==
- Asymmetric norm – Generalization of the concept of a norm
- Auxiliary normed space
- Hahn-Banach theorem – Theorem on extension of bounded linear functionals
- Linear functional – Linear map from a vector space to its field of scalars
- Minkowski functional – Function made from a set
- Norm (mathematics) – Length in a vector space
- Seminorm – Mathematical function
- Superadditivity – Property of a function

== Notes ==
Proofs

== Bibliography ==
- Kubrusly, Carlos S. (2011). The Elements of Operator Theory (Second ed.). Boston: Birkhäuser. ISBN 978-0-8176-4998-2. OCLC 710154895.
- Rudin, Walter (1991). Functional Analysis. International Series in Pure and Applied Mathematics. Vol. 8 (Second ed.). New York, NY: McGraw-Hill Science/Engineering/Math. ISBN 978-0-07-054236-5. OCLC 21163277.
- Narici, Lawrence; Beckenstein, Edward (2011). Topological Vector Spaces. Pure and applied mathematics (Second ed.). Boca Raton, FL: CRC Press. ISBN 978-1584888666. OCLC 144216834.
- Schaefer, Helmut H.; Wolff, Manfred P. (1999). Topological Vector Spaces. GTM. Vol. 8 (Second ed.). New York, NY: Springer New York Imprint Springer. ISBN 978-1-4612-7155-0. OCLC 840278135.
- Schechter, Eric (1996). Handbook of Analysis and Its Foundations. San Diego, CA: Academic Press. ISBN 978-0-12-622760-4. OCLC 175294365.
- Trèves, François (2006) [1967]. Topological Vector Spaces, Distributions and Kernels. Mineola, N.Y.: Dover Publications. ISBN 978-0-486-45352-1. OCLC 853623322.
