= Asymmetric norm =

Generalization of the concept of a norm

In mathematics, an asymmetric norm on a vector space is a generalization of the concept of a norm.

== Definition ==
An asymmetric norm on a real vector space $X$ is a function $p : X \to [0, +\infty)$ that has the following properties:

- Subadditivity, or the triangle inequality: $p(x + y) \leq p(x) + p(y) \text{ for all } x, y \in X.$
- Nonnegative homogeneity: $p(rx) = r p(x) \text{ for all } x \in X$ and every non-negative real number $r \geq 0.$
- Positive definiteness: $p(x) > 0 \text{ unless } x = 0$

Asymmetric norms differ from norms in that they need not satisfy the equality $p(-x) = p(x).$

If the condition of positive definiteness is omitted, then $p$ is an asymmetric seminorm. A weaker condition than positive definiteness is non-degeneracy: that for $x \neq 0,$ at least one of the two numbers $p(x)$ and $p(-x)$ is not zero.

== Examples ==
On the real line $\R,$ the function $p$ given by
$$p(x) = \begin{cases}|x|, & x \leq 0; \\ 2 |x|, & x \geq 0; \end{cases}$$
is an asymmetric norm but not a norm.

In a real vector space $X,$ the Minkowski functional $p_B$ of a convex subset $B\subseteq X$ that contains the origin is defined by the formula $p_B(x) = \inf \left\{r \geq 0: x \in r B \right\}\,$ for $x \in X$. This functional is an asymmetric seminorm if $B$ is an absorbing set, which means that $\bigcup_{r \geq 0} r B = X,$ and ensures that $p(x)$ is finite for each $x \in X.$

== Corresponce between asymmetric seminorms and convex subsets of the dual space ==
If $B^* \subseteq \R^n$ is a convex set that contains the origin, then an asymmetric seminorm $p$ can be defined on $\R^n$ by the formula $p(x) = \max_{\varphi \in B^*} \langle\varphi, x \rangle.$ For instance, if $B^* \subseteq \R^2$ is the square with vertices $(\pm 1,\pm 1),$ then $p$ is the taxicab norm $x = \left(x_0, x_1\right) \mapsto \left|x_0\right| + \left|x_1\right|.$ Different convex sets yield different seminorms, and every asymmetric seminorm on $\R^n$ can be obtained from some convex set, called its dual unit ball. Therefore, asymmetric seminorms are in one-to-one correspondence with convex sets that contain the origin. The seminorm $p$ is

- positive definite if and only if $B^*$ contains the origin in its topological interior,
- degenerate if and only if $B^*$ is contained in a linear subspace of dimension less than $n,$ and
- symmetric if and only if $B^* = -B^*.$

More generally, if $X$ is a finite-dimensional real vector space and $B^* \subseteq X^*$ is a compact convex subset of the dual space $X^*$ that contains the origin, then $p(x) = \max_{\varphi \in B^*} \varphi(x)$ is an asymmetric seminorm on $X.$

== See also ==
- Finsler manifold – Generalization of Riemannian manifolds
- Minkowski functional – Function made from a set
