= Anderson–Kadec theorem =

All infinite-dimensional, separable Banach spaces are homeomorphic

In mathematics, in the areas of topology and functional analysis, the Anderson–Kadec theorem states that any two infinite-dimensional, separable Banach spaces, or, more generally, Fréchet spaces, are homeomorphic as topological spaces. The theorem was proved by Mikhail Kadec (1966) and Richard Davis Anderson.

== Statement ==
Every infinite-dimensional, separable Fréchet space is homeomorphic to $\R^{\N},$ the Cartesian product of countably many copies of the real line $\R.$

== Preliminaries ==
Kadec norm: A norm $\|\,\cdot\,\|$ on a normed linear space $X$ is called a Kadec norm with respect to a total subset $A \subseteq X^*$ of the dual space $X^*$ if for each sequence $x_n\in X$ the following condition is satisfied:

- If $\lim_{n\to\infty} x^*\left(x_n\right) = x^*(x_0)$ for $x^* \in A$ and $\lim_{n\to\infty} \left\|x_n\right\| = \left\|x_0\right\|,$ then $\lim_{n\to\infty} \left\|x_n - x_0\right\| = 0.$

Eidelheit theorem: A Fréchet space $E$ is either isomorphic to a Banach space, or has a quotient space isomorphic to $\R^{\N}.$

Kadec renorming theorem: Every separable Banach space $X$ admits a Kadec norm with respect to a countable total subset $A \subseteq X^*$ of $X^*.$ The new norm is equivalent to the original norm $\|\,\cdot\,\|$ of $X.$ The set $A$ can be taken to be any weak-star dense countable subset of the unit ball of $X^*$

== Sketch of the proof ==
In the argument below $E$ denotes an infinite-dimensional separable Fréchet space and $\simeq$ the relation of topological equivalence (existence of homeomorphism).

A starting point of the proof of the Anderson–Kadec theorem is Kadec's proof that any infinite-dimensional separable Banach space is homeomorphic to $\R^{\N}.$

From Eidelheit theorem, it is enough to consider Fréchet space that are not isomorphic to a Banach space. In that case there they have a quotient that is isomorphic to $\R^{\N}.$ A result of Bartle-Graves-Michael proves that then
$$E \simeq Y \times \R^{\N}$$
for some Fréchet space $Y.$

On the other hand, $E$ is a closed subspace of a countable infinite product of separable Banach spaces $X = \prod_{n=1}^{\infty} X_i$ of separable Banach spaces. The same result of Bartle-Graves-Michael applied to $X$ gives a homeomorphism
$$X \simeq E \times Z$$
for some Fréchet space $Z.$ From Kadec's result the countable product of infinite-dimensional separable Banach spaces $X$ is homeomorphic to $\R^{\N}.$

The proof of Anderson–Kadec theorem consists of the sequence of equivalences
$$\begin{align}
\R^{\N}
&\simeq (E \times Z)^{\N}\\
&\simeq E^\N \times Z^{\N}\\
&\simeq E \times E^{\N} \times Z^{\N}\\
&\simeq E \times \R^{\N}\\
&\simeq Y \times \R^{\N} \times \R^{\N}\\
&\simeq Y \times \R^{\N} \\
&\simeq E
\end{align}$$

== See also ==
- Metrizable topological vector space – Topological vector space whose topology can be defined by a metric
