= Homogeneous function =

Function with a multiplicative scaling behaviour

In mathematics, a homogeneous function is a function of several variables such that the following holds: If each of the function's arguments is multiplied by the same scalar, then the function's value is multiplied by some power of this scalar; the power is called the degree of homogeneity, or simply the degree. That is, if k is an integer, a function f of n variables is homogeneous of degree k if

$$f(sx_1,\ldots, sx_n)=s^k f(x_1,\ldots, x_n)$$

for every $x_1, \ldots, x_n,$ and $s\ne 0.$ This is also referred to a kth-degree or kth-order homogeneous function.

For example, a homogeneous polynomial of degree k defines a homogeneous function of degree k.

The above definition extends to functions whose domain and codomain are vector spaces over a field F: a function $f : V \to W$ between two F-vector spaces is homogeneous of degree $k$ if

$f(s \mathbf{v}) = s^k f(\mathbf{v})$	1

for all nonzero $s \in F$ and $v \in V.$ This definition is often further generalized to functions whose domain is not V, but a cone in V, that is, a subset C of V such that $\mathbf{v}\in C$ implies $s \mathbf{v}\in C$ for every nonzero scalar s.

In the case of functions of several real variables and real vector spaces, a slightly more general form of homogeneity called positive homogeneity is often considered, by requiring only that the above identities hold for $s > 0,$ and allowing any real number k as a degree of homogeneity. Every homogeneous real function is positively homogeneous. The converse is not true, but is locally true in the sense that (for integer degrees) the two kinds of homogeneity cannot be distinguished by considering the behavior of a function near a given point.

A norm over a real vector space is an example of a positively homogeneous function that is not homogeneous. A special case is the absolute value of real numbers. The quotient of two homogeneous polynomials of the same degree gives an example of a homogeneous function of degree zero. This example is fundamental in the definition of projective schemes.

== Definitions ==
The concept of a homogeneous function was originally introduced for functions of several real variables. With the definition of vector spaces at the end of 19th century, the concept has been naturally extended to functions between vector spaces, since a tuple of variable values can be considered as a coordinate vector. It is this more general point of view that is described in this article.

There are two commonly used definitions. The general one works for vector spaces over arbitrary fields, and is restricted to degrees of homogeneity that are integers.

The second one supposes to work over the field of real numbers, or, more generally, over an ordered field. This definition restricts to positive values the scaling factor that occurs in the definition, and is therefore called positive homogeneity, the qualificative positive being often omitted when there is no risk of confusion. Positive homogeneity leads to considering more functions as homogeneous. For example, the absolute value and all norms are positively homogeneous functions that are not homogeneous.

The restriction of the scaling factor to real positive values allows also considering homogeneous functions whose degree of homogeneity is any real number.

=== General homogeneity ===
Let V and W be two vector spaces over a field F. A linear cone in V is a subset C of V such that $sx\in C$ for all $x\in C$ and all nonzero $s\in F.$

A homogeneous function f from V to W is a partial function from V to W that has a linear cone C as its domain, and satisfies

$$f(sx) = s^kf(x)$$

for some integer k, every $x\in C,$ and every nonzero $s\in F.$ The integer k is called the degree of homogeneity, or simply the degree of f.

A typical example of a homogeneous function of degree k is the function defined by a homogeneous polynomial of degree k. The rational function defined by the quotient of two homogeneous polynomials is a homogeneous function; its degree is the difference of the degrees of the numerator and the denominator; its cone of definition is the linear cone of the points where the value of denominator is not zero.

Homogeneous functions play a fundamental role in projective geometry since any homogeneous function f from V to W defines a well-defined function between the projectivizations of V and W. The homogeneous rational functions of degree zero (those defined by the quotient of two homogeneous polynomial of the same degree) play an essential role in the Proj construction of projective schemes.

=== Positive homogeneity ===
When working over the real numbers, or more generally over an ordered field, it is commonly convenient to consider positive homogeneity, the definition being exactly the same as that in the preceding section, with "nonzero s" replaced by "s > 0" in the definitions of a linear cone and a homogeneous function.

This change allows considering (positively) homogeneous functions with any real number as their degrees, since exponentiation with a positive real base is well defined.

Even in the case of integer degrees, there are many useful functions that are positively homogeneous without being homogeneous. This is, in particular, the case of the absolute value function and norms, which are all positively homogeneous of degree 1. They are not homogeneous since $|-x|=|x|\neq -|x|$ if $x\neq 0.$ This remains true in the complex case, since the field of the complex numbers $\C$ and every complex vector space can be considered as real vector spaces.

Euler's homogeneous function theorem is a characterization of positively homogeneous differentiable functions, which may be considered as the fundamental theorem on homogeneous functions.

== Examples ==
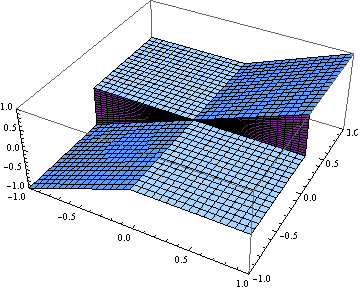
A homogeneous function is not necessarily continuous, as shown by this example. This is the function $f$ defined by $f(x,y) = x$ if $xy > 0$ and $f(x, y) = 0$ if $xy \leq 0.$ This function is homogeneous of degree 1, that is, $f(s x, s y) = s f(x,y)$ for any real numbers $s, x, y.$ It is discontinuous at $y = 0, x \neq 0.$

=== Simple example ===
The function $f(x, y) = x^2 + y^2$ is homogeneous of degree 2:
$$f(tx, ty) = (tx)^2 + (ty)^2 =  t^2 \left(x^2 + y^2\right) =  t^2 f(x, y).$$

=== Absolute value and norms ===
The absolute value of a real number is a positively homogeneous function of degree 1, which is not homogeneous, since $|sx|=s|x|$ if $s>0,$ and $|sx|=-s|x|$ if $s<0.$

The absolute value of a complex number is a positively homogeneous function of degree $1$ over the real numbers (that is, when considering the complex numbers as a vector space over the real numbers). It is not homogeneous, over the real numbers as well as over the complex numbers.

More generally, every norm and seminorm is a positively homogeneous function of degree 1 which is not a homogeneous function. As for the absolute value, if the norm or semi-norm is defined on a vector space over the complex numbers, this vector space has to be considered as vector space over the real number for applying the definition of a positively homogeneous function.

=== Linear maps ===
Any linear map $f : V \to W$ between vector spaces over a field F is homogeneous of degree 1, by the definition of linearity:
$$f(\alpha \mathbf{v}) = \alpha f(\mathbf{v})$$
for all $\alpha \in {F}$ and $v \in V.$

Similarly, any multilinear function $f : V_1 \times V_2 \times \cdots V_n \to W$ is homogeneous of degree $n,$ by the definition of multilinearity:
$$f\left(\alpha \mathbf{v}_1, \ldots, \alpha \mathbf{v}_n\right) = \alpha^n f(\mathbf{v}_1, \ldots, \mathbf{v}_n)$$
for all $\alpha \in {F}$ and $v_1 \in V_1, v_2 \in V_2, \ldots, v_n \in V_n.$

=== Homogeneous polynomials ===
Monomials in $n$ variables define homogeneous functions $f : \mathbb{F}^n \to \mathbb{F}.$ For example,
$$f(x, y, z) = x^5 y^2 z^3 \,$$
is homogeneous of degree 10 since
$$f(\alpha x, \alpha y, \alpha z) = (\alpha x)^5(\alpha y)^2(\alpha z)^3 = \alpha^{10} x^5 y^2 z^3 = \alpha^{10} f(x, y, z). \,$$
The degree is the sum of the exponents on the variables; in this example, $10 = 5 + 2 + 3.$

A homogeneous polynomial is a polynomial made up of a sum of monomials of the same degree. For example,
$$x^5 + 2x^3 y^2 + 9xy^4$$
is a homogeneous polynomial of degree 5. Homogeneous polynomials also define homogeneous functions.

Given a homogeneous polynomial of degree $k$ with real coefficients that takes only positive values, one gets a positively homogeneous function of degree $k/d$ by raising it to the power $1 / d.$ So for example, the following function is positively homogeneous of degree 1 but not homogeneous:
$$\left(x^2 + y^2 + z^2\right)^\frac{1}{2}.$$

=== Min/max ===
For every set of weights $w_1,\dots,w_n,$ the following functions are positively homogeneous of degree 1, but not homogeneous:

- $\min\left(\frac{x_1}{w_1}, \dots, \frac{x_n}{w_n}\right)$ (Leontief utilities)
- $\max\left(\frac{x_1}{w_1}, \dots, \frac{x_n}{w_n}\right)$

=== Rational functions ===
Rational functions formed as the ratio of two homogeneous polynomials are homogeneous functions in their domain, that is, off of the linear cone formed by the zeros of the denominator. Thus, if $f$ is homogeneous of degree $m$ and $g$ is homogeneous of degree $n,$ then $f / g$ is homogeneous of degree $m - n$ away from the zeros of $g.$

=== Non-examples ===
The homogeneous real functions of a single variable have the form $x\mapsto cx^k$ for some constant c. So, the affine function $x\mapsto x+5,$ the natural logarithm $x\mapsto \ln(x),$ and the exponential function $x\mapsto e^x$ are not homogeneous.

== Euler's theorem ==
Roughly speaking, Euler's homogeneous function theorem asserts that the positively homogeneous functions of a given degree are exactly the solution of a specific partial differential equation. More precisely:

Euler's homogeneous function theorem—If f is a (partial) function of n real variables that is positively homogeneous of degree k, and continuously differentiable in some open subset of $\R^n,$ then it satisfies in this open set the partial differential equation
$$k\,f(x_1, \ldots,x_n)=\sum_{i=1}^n x_i\frac{\partial f}{\partial x_i}(x_1, \ldots,x_n).$$

Conversely, every maximal continuously differentiable solution of this partial differentiable equation is a positively homogeneous function of degree k, defined on a positive cone (here, maximal means that the solution cannot be prolongated to a function with a larger domain).

Proof

For having simpler formulas, we set $\mathbf x=(x_1, \ldots, x_n).$ The first part results by using the chain rule for differentiating both sides of the equation $f(s\mathbf x ) = s^k f(\mathbf x)$ with respect to $s,$ and taking the limit of the result when s tends to 1.

The converse is proved by integrating a simple differential equation. Let $\mathbf{x}$ be in the interior of the domain of f. For s sufficiently close to 1, the function $g(s) = f(s \mathbf{x})$ is well defined. The partial differential equation implies that
$$sg'(s)= k f(s \mathbf{x})=k g(s).$$
The solutions of this linear differential equation have the form $g(s)=g(1)s^k.$ Therefore,
$$f(s \mathbf{x}) = g(s) = s^k g(1) = s^k f(\mathbf{x}),$$
if s is sufficiently close to 1. If this solution of the partial differential equation would not be defined for all positive s, then the functional equation would allow to prolongate the solution, and the partial differential equation implies that this prolongation is unique. So, the domain of a maximal solution of the partial differential equation is a linear cone, and the solution is positively homogeneous of degree k. $\square$

As a consequence, if $f : \R^n \to \R$ is continuously differentiable and homogeneous of degree $k,$ its first-order partial derivatives $\partial f/\partial x_i$ are homogeneous of degree $k - 1.$ This results from Euler's theorem by differentiating the partial differential equation with respect to one variable.

In the case of a function of a single real variable ($n = 1$), the theorem implies that a continuously differentiable and positively homogeneous function of degree k has the form $f(x)=c_+ x^k$ for $x>0$ and $f(x)=c_- x^k$ for $x<0.$ The constants $c_+$ and $c_-$ are not necessarily the same, as it is the case for the absolute value.

== Application to differential equations ==
The substitution $v = y / x$ converts the ordinary differential equation
$$I(x, y)\frac{\mathrm{d}y}{\mathrm{d}x} + J(x,y) = 0,$$
where $I$ and $J$ are homogeneous functions of the same degree, into the separable differential equation
$$x \frac{\mathrm{d}v}{\mathrm{d}x} = - \frac{J(1,v)}{I(1,v)} - v.$$

== Generalizations ==
=== Homogeneity under a monoid action ===
The definitions given above are all specialized cases of the following more general notion of homogeneity in which $X$ can be any set (rather than a vector space) and the real numbers can be replaced by the more general notion of a monoid.

Let $M$ be a monoid with identity element $1 \in M,$ let $X$ and $Y$ be sets, and suppose that on both $X$ and $Y$ there are defined monoid actions of $M.$ Let $k$ be a non-negative integer and let $f : X \to Y$ be a map. Then $f$ is said to be homogeneous of degree $k$ over $M$ if for every $x \in X$ and $m \in M,$
$$f(mx) = m^k f(x).$$
If in addition there is a function $M \to M,$ denoted by $m \mapsto |m|,$ called an absolute value then $f$ is said to be absolutely homogeneous of degree $k$ over $M$ if for every $x \in X$ and $m \in M,$
$$f(mx) = |m|^k f(x).$$

A function is homogeneous over $M$ (resp. absolutely homogeneous over $M$) if it is homogeneous of degree $1$ over $M$ (resp. absolutely homogeneous of degree $1$ over $M$).

More generally, it is possible for the symbols $m^k$ to be defined for $m \in M$ with $k$ being something other than an integer (for example, if $M$ is the real numbers and $k$ is a non-zero real number then $m^k$ is defined even though $k$ is not an integer). If this is the case then $f$ will be called homogeneous of degree $k$ over $M$ if the same equality holds:
$$f(mx) = m^k f(x) \quad \text{ for every } x \in X \text{ and } m \in M.$$

The notion of being absolutely homogeneous of degree $k$ over $M$ is generalized similarly.

=== Distributions (generalized functions) ===
A continuous function $f$ on $\R^n$ is homogeneous of degree $k$ if and only if
$$\int_{\R^n} f(tx) \varphi(x)\, dx = t^k \int_{\R^n} f(x)\varphi(x)\, dx$$
for all compactly supported test functions $\varphi$; and nonzero real $t.$ Equivalently, making a change of variable $y = tx,$ $f$ is homogeneous of degree $k$ if and only if
$$t^{-n}\int_{\R^n} f(y)\varphi\left(\frac{y}{t}\right)\, dy = t^k \int_{\R^n} f(y)\varphi(y)\, dy$$
for all $t$ and all test functions $\varphi.$ The last display makes it possible to define homogeneity of distributions. A distribution $S$ is homogeneous of degree $k$ if
$$t^{-n} \langle S, \varphi \circ \mu_t \rangle = t^k \langle S, \varphi \rangle$$
for all nonzero real $t$ and all test functions $\varphi.$ Here the angle brackets denote the pairing between distributions and test functions, and $\mu_t : \R^n \to \R^n$ is the mapping of scalar division by the real number $t.$

== Glossary of name variants ==
Let $f : X \to Y$ be a map between two vector spaces over a field $\mathbb{F}$ (usually the real numbers $\R$ or complex numbers $\Complex$). If $S$ is a set of scalars, such as $\Z,$ $[0, \infty),$ or $\Reals$ for example, then $f$ is said to be homogeneous over $S$ if $f(s x) = s f(x)$ for every $x \in X$ and scalar $s \in S.$ For instance, every additive map between vector spaces is homogeneous over the rational numbers $S := \Q$ although it might not be homogeneous over the real numbers $S := \R.$

The following commonly encountered special cases and variations of this definition have their own terminology:

1. (Strict) Positive homogeneity: $f(rx) = r f(x)$ for all $x \in X$ and all positive real $r > 0.$
  - When the function $f$ is valued in a vector space or field, then this property is logically equivalent (Note: Assume that $f$ is strictly positively homogeneous and valued in a vector space or a field. Then $f(0) = f(2 \cdot 0) = 2 f(0)$ so subtracting $f(0)$ from both sides shows that $f(0) = 0.$ Writing $r := 0,$ then for any $x \in X,$ $f(r x) = f(0) = 0 = 0 f(x) = r f(x),$ which shows that $f$ is nonnegative homogeneous.) to nonnegative homogeneity, which by definition means: $f(rx) = r f(x)$ for all $x \in X$ and all non-negative real $r \geq 0.$ It is for this reason that positive homogeneity is often also called nonnegative homogeneity. However, for functions valued in the extended real numbers $[-\infty, \infty] = \Reals \cup \{\pm \infty\},$ which appear in fields like convex analysis, the multiplication $0 \cdot f(x)$ will be undefined whenever $f(x) = \pm \infty$ and so these statements are not necessarily always interchangeable. (Note: However, if such an $f$ satisfies $f(rx) = r f(x)$ for all $r > 0$ and $x \in X,$ then necessarily $f(0) \in \{\pm \infty, 0\}$ and whenever $f(0), f(x) \in \R$ are both real then $f(r x) = r f(x)$ will hold for all $r \geq 0.$)
  - This property is used in the definition of a sublinear function.
  - Minkowski functionals are exactly those non-negative extended real-valued functions with this property.
2. Real homogeneity: $f(rx) = r f(x)$ for all $x \in X$ and all real $r.$
  - This property is used in the definition of a real linear functional.
3. Homogeneity: $f(sx) = s f(x)$ for all $x \in X$ and all scalars $s \in \mathbb{F}.$
  - It is emphasized that this definition depends on the scalar field $\mathbb{F}$ underlying the domain $X.$
  - This property is used in the definition of linear functionals and linear maps.
4. Conjugate homogeneity: $f(sx) = \overline{s} f(x)$ for all $x \in X$ and all scalars $s \in \mathbb{F}.$
  - If $\mathbb{F} = \Complex$ then $\overline{s}$ typically denotes the complex conjugate of $s$. But more generally, as with semilinear maps for example, $\overline{s}$ could be the image of $s$ under some distinguished automorphism of $\mathbb{F}.$
  - Along with additivity, this property is assumed in the definition of an antilinear map. It is also assumed that one of the two coordinates of a sesquilinear form has this property (such as the inner product of a Hilbert space).

All of the above definitions can be generalized by replacing the condition $f(rx) = r f(x)$ with $f(rx) = |r| f(x),$ in which case that definition is prefixed with the word "absolute" or "absolutely." For example,

5. Absolute homogeneity: $f(sx) = |s| f(x)$ for all $x \in X$ and all scalars $s \in \mathbb{F}.$
  - This property is used in the definition of a seminorm and a norm.

If $k$ is a fixed real number then the above definitions can be further generalized by replacing the condition $f(rx) = r f(x)$ with $f(rx) = r^k f(x)$ (and similarly, by replacing $f(rx) = |r| f(x)$ with $f(rx) = |r|^k f(x)$ for conditions using the absolute value, etc.), in which case the homogeneity is said to be "of degree $k$" (where in particular, all of the above definitions are "of degree $1$"). For instance,

6. Real homogeneity of degree $k$: $f(rx) = r^k f(x)$ for all $x \in X$ and all real $r.$
7. Homogeneity of degree $k$: $f(sx) = s^k f(x)$ for all $x \in X$ and all scalars $s \in \mathbb{F}.$
8. Absolute real homogeneity of degree $k$: $f(rx) = |r|^k f(x)$ for all $x \in X$ and all real $r.$
9. Absolute homogeneity of degree $k$: $f(sx) = |s|^k f(x)$ for all $x \in X$ and all scalars $s \in \mathbb{F}.$

A nonzero continuous function that is homogeneous of degree $k$ on $\R^n \backslash \lbrace 0 \rbrace$ extends continuously to $\R^n$ if and only if $k > 0.$

== See also ==
- Homogeneous space
- Triangle center function – Point in a triangle that can be seen as its middle under some criteria

== Notes ==
Proofs

== Sources ==
- Blatter, Christian (1979). "20. Mehrdimensionale Differentialrechnung, Aufgaben, 1.". Analysis II (in German) (2nd ed.). Springer Verlag. p. 188. ISBN 3-540-09484-9.
- Kubrusly, Carlos S. (2011). The Elements of Operator Theory (Second ed.). Boston: Birkhäuser. ISBN 978-0-8176-4998-2. OCLC 710154895.
- Schaefer, Helmut H.; Wolff, Manfred P. (1999). Topological Vector Spaces. GTM. Vol. 8 (Second ed.). New York, NY: Springer New York Imprint Springer. ISBN 978-1-4612-7155-0. OCLC 840278135.
- Schechter, Eric (1996). Handbook of Analysis and Its Foundations. San Diego, CA: Academic Press. ISBN 978-0-12-622760-4. OCLC 175294365.
