= Minkowski functional =

Function made from a set

In mathematics, in the field of functional analysis, a Minkowski functional (after Hermann Minkowski) or gauge function is a function that recovers a notion of distance on a linear space.

If $K$ is a subset of a real or complex vector space $X,$ then the Minkowski functional or gauge of $K$ is defined to be the function $p_K : X \to [0, \infty],$ valued in the extended real numbers, defined by
$$p_K(x) = \inf \{r \in \R : r > 0 \text{ and } x \in r K\}, \quad  x \in X,$$
where the infimum of the empty set is defined to be positive infinity.

The set $K$ is often assumed to have properties, such as being an absorbing disk in $X$, that guarantee that $p_K$ will be a seminorm on $X.$ In fact, every seminorm $p$ on $X$ is equal to the Minkowski functional (that is, $p = p_K$) of any subset $K$ of $X$ satisfying

$$\{x \in X : p(x) < 1\} \subseteq K \subseteq \{x \in X : p(x) \leq 1\}$$

(where all three of these sets are necessarily absorbing in $X$ and the first and last are also disks).

Thus every seminorm (which is a function defined by purely algebraic properties) can be associated (non-uniquely) with an absorbing disk (which is a set with certain geometric properties) and conversely, every absorbing disk can be associated with its Minkowski functional (which will necessarily be a seminorm). These relationships between seminorms, Minkowski functionals, and absorbing disks is a major reason why Minkowski functionals are studied and used in functional analysis. In particular, through these relationships, Minkowski functionals allow one to "translate" certain geometric properties of a subset of $X$ into certain algebraic properties of a function on $X.$

The Minkowski function is always non-negative (meaning $p_K \geq 0$). This property of being nonnegative stands in contrast to other classes of functions, such as sublinear functions and real linear functionals, that do allow negative values. However, $p_K$ might not be real-valued since for any given $x \in X,$ the value $p_K(x)$ is a real number if and only if $\{r > 0 : x \in r K\}$ is not empty. Consequently, $K$ is usually assumed to have properties (such as being absorbing in $X,$ for instance) that will guarantee that $p_K$ is real-valued.

== Definition ==
Let $K$ be a subset of a real or complex vector space $X.$ Define the gauge of $K$ or the Minkowski functional associated with or induced by $K$ as being the function $p_K : X \to [0, \infty],$ valued in the extended real numbers, defined by

$$p_K(x) := \inf \{r > 0 : x \in r K\},$$

(recall that the infimum of the empty set is $\,\infty$, that is, $\inf \varnothing = \infty$). Here, $\{r > 0 : x \in r K\}$ is shorthand for $\{r \in \R : r > 0 \text{ and } x \in r K\}.$

For any $x \in X,$ $p_K(x) \neq \infty$ if and only if $\{r > 0 : x \in r K\}$ is not empty. The arithmetic operations on $\R$ can be extended to operate on $\pm \infty,$ where $\frac{r}{\pm \infty} := 0$ for all non-zero real $- \infty < r < \infty.$ The products $0 \cdot \infty$ and $0 \cdot - \infty$ remain undefined.

=== Some conditions making a gauge real-valued ===
In the field of convex analysis, the map $p_K$ taking on the value of $\,\infty\,$ is not necessarily an issue. However, in functional analysis $p_K$ is almost always real-valued (that is, to never take on the value of $\,\infty\,$), which happens if and only if the set $\{r > 0 : x \in r K\}$ is non-empty for every $x \in X.$

In order for $p_K$ to be real-valued, it suffices for the origin of $X$ to belong to the algebraic interior or core of $K$ in $X.$ If $K$ is absorbing in $X,$ where recall that this implies that $0 \in K,$ then the origin belongs to the algebraic interior of $K$ in $X$ and thus $p_K$ is real-valued. Characterizations of when $p_K$ is real-valued are given below.

== Motivating examples ==
=== Example 1 ===
Consider a normed vector space $(X, \|\,\cdot\,\|),$ with the norm $\|\,\cdot\,\|$ and let $U := \{x\in X : \|x\| \leq 1\}$ be the unit ball in $X.$ Then for every $x \in X,$ $\|x\| = p_U(x).$ Thus the Minkowski functional $p_U$ is just the norm on $X.$

=== Example 2 ===
Let $X$ be a vector space without topology with underlying scalar field $\mathbb{K}.$ Let $f : X \to \mathbb{K}$ be any linear functional on $X$ (not necessarily continuous). Fix $a > 0.$ Let $K$ be the set
$$K := \{x \in X : |f(x)| \leq a\}$$
and let $p_K$ be the Minkowski functional of $K.$ Then
$$p_K(x) = \frac{1}{a} |f(x)| \quad \text{ for all } x \in X.$$
The function $p_K$ has the following properties:

1. It is subadditive: $p_K(x + y) \leq p_K(x) + p_K(y).$
2. It is absolutely homogeneous: $p_K(s x) = |s| p_K(x)$ for all scalars $s.$
3. It is nonnegative: $p_K \geq 0.$

Therefore, $p_K$ is a seminorm on $X,$ with an induced topology. This is characteristic of Minkowski functionals defined via "nice" sets. There is a one-to-one correspondence between seminorms and the Minkowski functional given by such sets. What is meant precisely by "nice" is discussed in the section below.

Notice that, in contrast to a stronger requirement for a norm, $p_K(x) = 0$ need not imply $x = 0.$ In the above example, one can take a nonzero $x$ from the kernel of $f.$ Consequently, the resulting topology need not be Hausdorff.

== Common conditions guaranteeing gauges are seminorms ==
To guarantee that $p_K(0) = 0,$ it will henceforth be assumed that $0 \in K.$

In order for $p_K$ to be a seminorm, it suffices for $K$ to be a disk (that is, convex and balanced) and absorbing in $X,$ which are the most common assumption placed on $K.$

Theorem—If $K$ is an absorbing disk in a vector space $X$ then the Minkowski functional of $K,$ which is the map $p_K : X \to [0, \infty)$ defined by
$$p_K(x) := \inf \{r > 0 : x \in r K\},$$
is a seminorm on $X.$ Moreover,
$$p_K(x) = \frac{1}{\sup \{r > 0 : r x \in K\}}.$$

More generally, if $K$ is convex and the origin belongs to the algebraic interior of $K,$ then $p_K$ is a nonnegative sublinear functional on $X,$ which implies in particular that it is subadditive and positive homogeneous. If $K$ is absorbing in $X$ then $p_{[0, 1] K}$ is positive homogeneous, meaning that $p_{[0, 1] K}(s x) = s p_{[0, 1] K}(x)$ for all real $s \geq 0,$ where $[0, 1] K = \{t k : t \in [0, 1], k \in K\}.$ If $q$ is a nonnegative real-valued function on $X$ that is positive homogeneous, then the sets $U := \{x \in X : q(x) < 1\}$ and $D := \{x \in X : q(x) \leq 1\}$ satisfy $[0, 1] U = U$ and $[0, 1] D = D;$ if in addition $q$ is absolutely homogeneous then both $U$ and $D$ are balanced.

=== Gauges of absorbing disks ===
Arguably the most common requirements placed on a set $K$ to guarantee that $p_K$ is a seminorm are that $K$ be an absorbing disk in $X.$ Due to how common these assumptions are, the properties of a Minkowski functional $p_K$ when $K$ is an absorbing disk will now be investigated. Since all of the results mentioned above made few (if any) assumptions on $K,$ they can be applied in this special case.

Theorem—Assume that $K$ is an absorbing subset of $X.$ It is shown that:

1. If $K$ is convex then $p_K$ is subadditive.
2. If $K$ is balanced then $p_K$ is absolutely homogeneous; that is, $p_K(s x) = |s| p_K(x)$ for all scalars $s.$

Proof that the Gauge of an absorbing disk is a seminorm

Convexity and subadditivity

A simple geometric argument that shows convexity of $K$ implies subadditivity is as follows. Suppose for the moment that $p_K(x) = p_K(y) = r.$ Then for all $e > 0,$ $x, y \in K_e := (r, e) K.$ Since $K$ is convex and $r + e \neq 0,$ $K_e$ is also convex. Therefore, $\frac{1}{2} x + \frac{1}{2} y \in K_e.$ By definition of the Minkowski functional $p_K,$
$$p_K\left(\frac{1}{2} x + \frac{1}{2} y\right) \leq r + e = \frac{1}{2} p_K(x) + \frac{1}{2} p_K(y) + e.$$

But the left hand side is $\frac{1}{2} p_K(x + y),$ so that
$$p_K(x + y) \leq p_K(x) + p_K(y) + 2 e.$$

Since $e > 0$ was arbitrary, it follows that $p_K(x + y) \leq p_K(x) + p_K(y),$ which is the desired inequality. The general case $p_K(x) > p_K(y)$ is obtained after the obvious modification.

Convexity of $K,$ together with the initial assumption that the set $\{r > 0 : x \in r K\}$ is nonempty, implies that $K$ is absorbing.

Balancedness and absolute homogeneity

Notice that $K$ being balanced implies that
$$\lambda x \in r K \quad \mbox{if and only if} \quad x \in \frac{r}{|\lambda|} K.$$

Therefore
$$p_K (\lambda x) = \inf \left\{r > 0 : \lambda x \in r K \right\}
= \inf \left\{r > 0 : x \in \frac{r}{|\lambda|} K \right\}
= \inf \left\{|\lambda|\frac{r}{|\lambda|} > 0 : x \in \frac{r}{|\lambda|} K \right\}
= |\lambda| p_K(x).$$

=== Algebraic properties ===
Let $X$ be a real or complex vector space and let $K$ be an absorbing disk in $X.$

- $p_K$ is a seminorm on $X.$
- $p_K$ is a norm on $X$ if and only if $K$ does not contain a non-trivial vector subspace.
- $p_{s K} = \frac{1}{|s|} p_K$ for any scalar $s \neq 0.$
- If $J$ is an absorbing disk in $X$ and $J \subseteq K$ then $p_K \leq p_J.$
- If $K$ is a set satisfying $\{x \in X : p(x) < 1\} \; \subseteq \; K \; \subseteq \; \{x \in X : p(x) \leq 1\}$ then $K$ is absorbing in $X$ and $p = p_K,$ where $p_K$ is the Minkowski functional associated with $K;$ that is, it is the gauge of $K.$
- In particular, if $K$ is as above and $q$ is any seminorm on $X,$ then $q = p$ if and only if $\{x \in X : q(x) < 1\} \; \subseteq \; K \; \subseteq \; \{x \in X : q(x) \leq 1\}.$
- If $x \in X$ satisfies $p_K(x) < 1$ then $x \in K.$

=== Topological properties ===
Assume that $X$ is a (real or complex) topological vector space (not necessarily Hausdorff or locally convex) and let $K$ be an absorbing disk in $X.$ Then

$$\operatorname{Int}_X K \; \subseteq \; \{x \in X : p_K(x) < 1\} \; \subseteq \; K \; \subseteq \; \{x \in X : p_K(x) \leq 1\} \; \subseteq \; \operatorname{Cl}_X K,$$

where $\operatorname{Int}_X K$ is the topological interior and $\operatorname{Cl}_X K$ is the topological closure of $K$ in $X.$ Importantly, it was not assumed that $p_K$ was continuous nor was it assumed that $K$ had any topological properties.

Moreover, the Minkowski functional $p_K$ is continuous if and only if $K$ is a neighborhood of the origin in $X.$ If $p_K$ is continuous then
$$\operatorname{Int}_X K = \{x \in X : p_K(x) < 1\} \quad \text{ and } \quad \operatorname{Cl}_X K = \{x \in X : p_K(x) \leq 1\}.$$

== Minimal requirements on the set ==
This section will investigate the most general case of the gauge of any subset $K$ of $X.$ The more common special case where $K$ is assumed to be an absorbing disk in $X$ was discussed above.

=== Properties ===
All results in this section may be applied to the case where $K$ is an absorbing disk.

Throughout, $K$ is any subset of $X.$

Summary—Suppose that $K$ is a subset of a real or complex vector space $X.$

1. Strict positive homogeneity: $p_K(r x) = r p_K(x)$ for all $x \in X$ and all positive real $r > 0.$
  - Positive/Nonnegative homogeneity: $p_K$ is nonnegative homogeneous if and only if $p_K$ is real-valued.
    - A map $p$ is called nonnegative homogeneous if $p(r x) = r p(x)$ for all $x \in X$ and all nonnegative real $r \geq 0.$ Since $0 \cdot \infty$ is undefined, a map that takes infinity as a value is not nonnegative homogeneous.
2. Real-values: $(0, \infty) K$ is the set of all points on which $p_K$ is real valued. So $p_K$ is real-valued if and only if $(0, \infty) K = X,$ in which case $0 \in K.$
  - Value at $0$: $p_K(0) \neq \infty$ if and only if $0 \in K$ if and only if $p_K(0) = 0.$
  - Null space: If $x \in X$ then $p_K(x) = 0$ if and only if $(0, \infty) x \subseteq (0, 1) K$ if and only if there exists a divergent sequence of positive real numbers $t_1, t_2, t_3, \cdots \to \infty$ such that $t_n x \in K$ for all $n.$ Moreover, the zero set of $p_K$ is $\ker p_K ~\stackrel{\scriptscriptstyle\text{def}}{=}~ \left\{y \in X : p_K(y) = 0 \right\} = {\textstyle\bigcap\limits_{e > 0}} (0, e) K.$
3. Comparison to a constant: If $0 \leq r \leq \infty$ then for any $x \in X,$ $p_K(x) < r$ if and only if $x \in (0, r) K;$ this can be restated as: If $0 \leq r \leq \infty$ then $p_K^{-1}([0, r)) = (0, r) K.$
  - It follows that if $0 \leq R < \infty$ is real then $p_K^{-1}([0, R]) = {\textstyle\bigcap\limits_{e > 0}} (0, R + e) K,$ where the set on the right hand side denotes ${\textstyle\bigcap\limits_{e > 0}} [(0, R + e) K]$ and not its subset $\left[{\textstyle\bigcap\limits_{e > 0}} (0, R + e)\right] K = (0, R] K.$ If $R > 0$ then these sets are equal if and only if $K$ contains $\left\{y \in X : p_K(y) = 1 \right\}.$
  - In particular, if $x \in R K$ or $x \in (0, R] K$ then $p_K(x) \leq R,$ but importantly, the converse is not necessarily true.
4. Gauge comparison: For any subset $L \subseteq X,$ $p_K \leq p_L$ if and only if $(0, 1) L \subseteq (0, 1) K;$ thus $p_L = p_K$ if and only if $(0, 1) L = (0, 1) K.$
  - The assignment $L \mapsto p_L$ is order-reversing in the sense that if $K \subseteq L$ then $p_L \leq p_K.$
  - Because the set $L := (0, 1) K$ satisfies $(0, 1) L = (0, 1) K,$ it follows that replacing $K$ with $p_K^{-1}([0, 1)) = (0, 1) K$ will not change the resulting Minkowski functional. The same is true of $L := (0, 1] K$ and of $L := p_K^{-1}([0, 1]).$
  - If $D ~\stackrel{\scriptscriptstyle\text{def}}{=}~ \left\{y \in X : p_K(y) = 1 \text{ or } p_K(y) = 0 \right\}$ then $p_D = p_K$ and $D$ has the particularly nice property that if $r > 0$ is real then $x \in r D$ if and only if $p_D(x) = r$ or $p_D(x) = 0.$ (Note: It is in general false that $x \in r D$ if and only if $p_D(x) = r$ (for example, consider when $p_K$ is a norm or a seminorm). The correct statement is: If $0 < r < \infty$ then $x \in r D$ if and only if $p_D(x) = r$ or $p_D(x) = 0.$) Moreover, if $r > 0$ is real then $p_D(x) \leq r$ if and only if $x \in (0, r] D.$
5. Subadditive/Triangle inequality: $p_K$ is subadditive if and only if $(0, 1) K$ is convex. If $K$ is convex then so are both $(0, 1) K$ and $(0, 1] K$ and moreover, $p_K$ is subadditive.
6. Scaling the set: If $s \neq 0$ is a scalar then $p_{s K}(y) = p_K\left(\tfrac{1}{s} y\right)$ for all $y \in X.$ Thus if $0 < r < \infty$ is real then $p_{r K}(y) = p_K\left(\tfrac{1}{r} y\right) = \tfrac{1}{r} p_K(y).$
7. Symmetric: $p_K$ is symmetric (meaning that $p_K(- y) = p_K(y)$ for all $y \in X$) if and only if $(0, 1) K$ is a symmetric set (meaning that$(0, 1) K = - (0, 1) K$), which happens if and only if $p_K = p_{- K}.$
8. Absolute homogeneity: $p_K(u x) = p_K(x)$ for all $x \in X$ and all unit length scalars $u$ (Note: $u$ is having unit length means that $|u| = 1.$) if and only if $(0, 1) u K \subseteq (0, 1) K$ for all unit length scalars $u,$ in which case $p_K(s x) = |s| p_K(x)$ for all $x \in X$ and all non-zero scalars $s \neq 0.$ If in addition $p_K$ is also real-valued then this holds for all scalars $s$ (that is, $p_K$ is absolutely homogeneous (Note: The map $p_K$ is called absolutely homogeneous if $|s| p_K(x)$ is well-defined and $p_K(s x) = |s| p_K(x)$ for all $x \in X$ and all scalars $s$ (not just non-zero scalars).)).
  - $(0, 1) u K \subseteq (0, 1) K$ for all unit length $u$ if and only if $(0, 1) u K = (0, 1) K$ for all unit length $u.$
  - $s K \subseteq K$ for all unit scalars $s$ if and only if $s K = K$ for all unit scalars $s;$ if this is the case then $(0, 1) K = (0, 1) s K$ for all unit scalars $s.$
  - The Minkowski functional of any balanced set is a balanced function.
9. Absorbing: If $K$ is convex or balanced and if $(0, \infty) K = X$ then $K$ is absorbing in $X.$
  - If a set $A$ is absorbing in $X$ and $A \subseteq K$ then $K$ is absorbing in $X.$
  - If $K$ is convex and $0 \in K$ then $[0, 1] K = K,$ in which case $(0, 1) K \subseteq K.$
10. Restriction to a vector subspace: If $S$ is a vector subspace of $X$ and if $p_{K \cap S} : S \to [0, \infty]$ denotes the Minkowski functional of $K \cap S$ on $S,$ then $p_K\big\vert_S = p_{K \cap S},$ where $p_K\big\vert_S$ denotes the restriction of $p_K$ to $S.$

Proof

The proofs of these basic properties are straightforward exercises so only the proofs of the most important statements are given.

The proof that a convex subset $A \subseteq X$ that satisfies $(0, \infty) A = X$ is necessarily absorbing in $X$ is straightforward and can be found in the article on absorbing sets.

For any real $t > 0,$

$$\{r > 0 : t x \in r K\} = \{t(r/t) : x \in (r/t) K\} = t \{s > 0 : x \in s K\}$$

so that taking the infimum of both sides shows that

$$p_K(tx) = \inf \{r > 0 : t x \in r K\} = t \inf \{s > 0 : x \in s K\} = t p_K(x).$$

This proves that Minkowski functionals are strictly positive homogeneous. For $0 \cdot p_K(x)$ to be well-defined, it is necessary and sufficient that $p_K(x) \neq \infty;$ thus $p_K(tx) = t p_K(x)$ for all $x \in X$ and all non-negative real $t \geq 0$ if and only if $p_K$ is real-valued.

The hypothesis of statement (7) allows us to conclude that $p_K(s x) = p_K(x)$ for all $x \in X$ and all scalars $s$ satisfying $|s| = 1.$ Every scalar $s$ is of the form $r e^{i t}$ for some real $t$ where $r := |s| \geq 0$ and $e^{i t}$ is real if and only if $s$ is real. The results in the statement about absolute homogeneity follow immediately from the aforementioned conclusion, from the strict positive homogeneity of $p_K,$ and from the positive homogeneity of $p_K$ when $p_K$ is real-valued. $\blacksquare$

=== Examples ===
1. If $\mathcal{L}$ is a non-empty collection of subsets of $X$ then $p_{\cup \mathcal{L}}(x) = \inf \left\{p_L(x) : L \in \mathcal{L} \right\}$ for all $x \in X,$ where $\cup \mathcal{L} ~\stackrel{\scriptscriptstyle\text{def}}{=}~ {\textstyle\bigcup\limits_{L \in \mathcal{L}}} L.$
  - Thus $p_{K \cup L}(x) = \min \left\{p_K(x), p_L(x) \right\}$ for all $x \in X.$
2. If $\mathcal{L}$ is a non-empty collection of subsets of $X$ and $I \subseteq X$ satisfies

$$\left\{x \in X : p_L(x) < 1 \text{ for all } L \in \mathcal{L}\right\} \quad \subseteq \quad I \quad \subseteq \quad \left\{x \in X : p_L(x) \leq 1 \text{ for all } L \in \mathcal{L}\right\}$$
then $p_I(x) = \sup \left\{p_L(x) : L \in \mathcal{L}\right\}$ for all $x \in X.$

The following examples show that the containment $(0, R] K \; \subseteq \; {\textstyle\bigcap\limits_{e > 0}} (0, R + e) K$ could be proper.

Example: If $R = 0$ and $K = X$ then $(0, R] K = (0, 0] X = \varnothing X = \varnothing$ but ${\textstyle\bigcap\limits_{e > 0}} (0, e) K = {\textstyle\bigcap\limits_{e > 0}} X = X,$ which shows that its possible for $(0, R] K$ to be a proper subset of ${\textstyle\bigcap\limits_{e > 0}} (0, R + e) K$ when $R = 0.$ $\blacksquare$

The next example shows that the containment can be proper when $R = 1;$ the example may be generalized to any real $R > 0.$ Assuming that $[0, 1] K \subseteq K,$ the following example is representative of how it happens that $x \in X$ satisfies $p_K(x) = 1$ but $x \not\in (0, 1] K.$

Example: Let $x \in X$ be non-zero and let $K = [0, 1) x$ so that $[0, 1] K = K$ and $x \not\in K.$ From $x \not\in (0, 1) K = K$ it follows that $p_K(x) \geq 1.$ That $p_K(x) \leq 1$ follows from observing that for every $e > 0,$ $(0, 1 + e) K = [0, 1 + e)([0, 1) x) = [0, 1 + e) x,$ which contains $x.$ Thus $p_K(x) = 1$ and $x \in {\textstyle\bigcap\limits_{e > 0}} (0, 1 + e) K.$ However, $(0, 1] K = (0, 1]([0, 1) x) = [0, 1) x = K$ so that $x \not\in (0, 1] K,$ as desired. $\blacksquare$

=== Positive homogeneity characterizes Minkowski functionals ===
The next theorem shows that Minkowski functionals are exactly those functions $f : X \to [0, \infty]$ that have a certain purely algebraic property that is commonly encountered.

Theorem—Let $f : X \to [0, \infty]$ be any function. The following statements are equivalent:

1. Strict positive homogeneity: $\; f(t x) = t f(x)$ for all $x \in X$ and all positive real $t > 0.$
  - This statement is equivalent to: $f(t x) \leq t f(x)$ for all $x \in X$ and all positive real $t > 0.$
2. $f$ is a Minkowski functional: meaning that there exists a subset $S \subseteq X$ such that $f = p_S.$
3. $f = p_K$ where $K := \{x \in X : f(x) \leq 1\}.$
4. $f = p_V \,$ where $V \,:= \{x \in X : f(x) < 1\}.$

Moreover, if $f$ never takes on the value $\,\infty\,$ (so that the product $0 \cdot f(x)$ is always well-defined) then this list may be extended to include:

5. Positive/Nonnegative homogeneity: $f(t x) = t f(x)$ for all $x \in X$ and all nonnegative real $t \geq 0$.

Proof

If $f(t x) \leq t f(x)$ holds for all $x \in X$ and real $t > 0$ then $t f(x) = t f\left(\tfrac{1}{t}(t x)\right) \leq t \tfrac{1}{t} f(t x) = f(t x) \leq t f(x)$ so that $t f(x) = f(t x).$

Only (1) implies (3) will be proven because afterwards, the rest of the theorem follows immediately from the basic properties of Minkowski functionals described earlier; properties that will henceforth be used without comment. So assume that $f : X \to [0, \infty]$ is a function such that $f(t x) = t f(x)$ for all $x \in X$ and all real $t > 0$ and let $K := \{y \in X : f(y) \leq 1\}.$

For all real $t > 0,$ $f(0) = f(t 0) = t f(0)$ so by taking $t = 2$ for instance, it follows that either $f(0) = 0$ or $f(0) = \infty.$ Let $x \in X.$ It remains to show that $f(x) = p_K(x).$

It will now be shown that if $f(x) = 0$ or $f(x) = \infty$ then $f(x) = p_K(x),$ so that in particular, it will follow that $f(0) = p_K(0).$ So suppose that $f(x) = 0$ or $f(x) = \infty;$ in either case $f(t x) = t f(x) = f(x)$ for all real $t > 0.$ Now if $f(x) = 0$ then this implies that that $t x \in K$ for all real $t > 0$ (since $f(t x) = 0 \leq 1$), which implies that $p_K(x) = 0,$ as desired. Similarly, if $f(x) = \infty$ then $t x \not\in K$ for all real $t > 0,$ which implies that $p_K(x) = \infty,$ as desired. Thus, it will henceforth be assumed that $R := f(x)$ a positive real number and that $x \neq 0$ (importantly, however, the possibility that $p_K(x)$ is $0$ or $\,\infty\,$ has not yet been ruled out).

Recall that just like $f,$ the function $p_K$ satisfies $p_K(t x) = t p_K(x)$ for all real $t > 0.$ Since $0 < \tfrac{1}{R} < \infty,$ $p_K(x)= R = f(x)$ if and only if $p_K\left(\tfrac{1}{R} x\right) = 1 = f\left(\tfrac{1}{R} x\right)$ so assume without loss of generality that $R = 1$ and it remains to show that $p_K\left(\tfrac{1}{R} x\right) = 1.$ Since $f(x) = 1,$ $x \in K \subseteq (0, 1] K,$ which implies that $p_K(x) \leq 1$ (so in particular, $p_K(x) \neq \infty$ is guaranteed). It remains to show that $p_K(x) \geq 1,$ which recall happens if and only if $x \not\in (0, 1) K.$ So assume for the sake of contradiction that $x \in (0, 1) K$ and let $0 < r < 1$ and $k \in K$ be such that $x = r k,$ where note that $k \in K$ implies that $f(k) \leq 1.$ Then $1 = f(x) = f(r k) = r f(k) \leq r < 1.$ $\blacksquare$

This theorem can be extended to characterize certain classes of $[- \infty, \infty]$-valued maps (for example, real-valued sublinear functions) in terms of Minkowski functionals. For instance, it can be used to describe how every real homogeneous function $f : X \to \R$ (such as linear functionals) can be written in terms of a unique Minkowski functional having a certain property.

=== Characterizing Minkowski functionals on star sets ===
Proposition—Let $f : X \to [0, \infty]$ be any function and $K \subseteq X$ be any subset. The following statements are equivalent:

1. $f$ is (strictly) positive homogeneous, $f(0) = 0,$ and
  $$\{x \in X : f(x) < 1\} \; \subseteq \; K \; \subseteq \; \{x \in X : f(x) \leq 1\}.$$
2. $f$ is the Minkowski functional of $K$ (that is, $f = p_K$), $K$ contains the origin, and $K$ is star-shaped at the origin.
  - The set $K$ is star-shaped at the origin if and only if $t k \in K$ whenever $k \in K$ and $0 \leq t \leq 1.$ A set that is star-shaped at the origin is sometimes called a star set.

=== Characterizing Minkowski functionals that are seminorms ===
In this next theorem, which follows immediately from the statements above, $K$ is not assumed to be absorbing in $X$ and instead, it is deduced that $(0, 1) K$ is absorbing when $p_K$ is a seminorm. It is also not assumed that $K$ is balanced (which is a property that $K$ is often required to have); in its place is the weaker condition that $(0, 1) s K \subseteq (0, 1) K$ for all scalars $s$ satisfying $|s| = 1.$ The common requirement that $K$ be convex is also weakened to only requiring that $(0, 1) K$ be convex.

Theorem—Let $K$ be a subset of a real or complex vector space $X.$ Then $p_K$ is a seminorm on $X$ if and only if all of the following conditions hold:

1. $(0, \infty) K = X$ (or equivalently, $p_K$ is real-valued).
2. $(0, 1) K$ is convex (or equivalently, $p_K$ is subadditive).
  - It suffices (but is not necessary) for $K$ to be convex.
3. $(0, 1) u K \subseteq (0, 1) K$ for all unit scalars $u.$
  - This condition is satisfied if $K$ is balanced or more generally if $u K \subseteq K$ for all unit scalars $u.$

in which case $0 \in K$ and both $(0, 1) K = \{x \in X : p(x) < 1\}$ and $\bigcap_{e > 0} (0, 1 + e) K = \left\{x \in X : p_K(x) \leq 1\right\}$ will be convex, balanced, and absorbing subsets of $X.$

Conversely, if $f$ is a seminorm on $X$ then the set $V := \{x \in X : f(x) < 1\}$ satisfies all three of the above conditions (and thus also the conclusions) and also $f = p_V;$ moreover, $V$ is necessarily convex, balanced, absorbing, and satisfies $(0, 1) V = V = [0, 1] V.$

Corollary—If $K$ is a convex, balanced, and absorbing subset of a real or complex vector space $X,$ then $p_K$ is a seminorm on $X.$

=== Positive sublinear functions and Minkowski functionals ===
It may be shown that a real-valued subadditive function $f : X \to \R$ on an arbitrary topological vector space $X$ is continuous at the origin if and only if it is uniformly continuous, where if in addition $f$ is nonnegative, then $f$ is continuous if and only if $V := \{x \in X : f(x) < 1\}$ is an open neighborhood in $X.$ If $f : X \to \R$ is subadditive and satisfies $f(0) = 0,$ then $f$ is continuous if and only if its absolute value $|f| : X \to [0, \infty)$ is continuous.

A nonnegative sublinear function is a nonnegative homogeneous function $f : X \to [0, \infty)$ that satisfies the triangle inequality. It follows immediately from the results below that for such a function $f,$ if $V := \{x \in X : f(x) < 1\}$ then $f = p_V.$ Given $K \subseteq X,$ the Minkowski functional $p_K$ is a sublinear function if and only if it is real-valued and subadditive, which is happens if and only if $(0, \infty) K = X$ and $(0, 1) K$ is convex.

=== Correspondence between open convex sets and positive continuous sublinear functions ===
Theorem—Suppose that $X$ is a topological vector space (not necessarily locally convex or Hausdorff) over the real or complex numbers. Then the non-empty open convex subsets of $X$ are exactly those sets that are of the form $z + \{x \in X : p(x) < 1\} = \{x \in X : p(x - z) < 1\}$ for some $z \in X$ and some positive continuous sublinear function $p$ on $X.$

Proof

Let $V \neq \varnothing$ be an open convex subset of $X.$ If $0 \in V$ then let $z := 0$ and otherwise let $z \in V$ be arbitrary. Let $p = p_K : X \to [0, \infty)$ be the Minkowski functional of $K := V - z$ where this convex open neighborhood of the origin satisfies $(0, 1) K = K.$ Then $p$ is a continuous sublinear function on $X$ since $V - z$ is convex, absorbing, and open (however, $p$ is not necessarily a seminorm since it is not necessarily absolutely homogeneous). From the properties of Minkowski functionals, we have $p_K^{-1}([0, 1)) = (0, 1) K,$ from which it follows that $V - z = \{x \in X : p(x) < 1\}$ and so $V = z + \{x \in X : p(x) < 1\}.$ Since $z + \{x \in X : p(x) < 1\} = \{x \in X : p(x - z) < 1\},$ this completes the proof. $\blacksquare$

== See also ==
- Asymmetric norm – Generalization of the concept of a norm
- Auxiliary normed space
- Cauchy's functional equation – Functional equation
- Finest locally convex topology – Vector space with a topology defined by convex open sets
- Finsler manifold – Generalization of Riemannian manifolds
- Hadwiger's theorem – Theorem in integral geometry
- Hugo Hadwiger – Swiss mathematician (1908–1981)
- Locally convex topological vector space – Vector space with a topology defined by convex open sets
- Morphological image processing – Theory and technique for handling geometrical structures
- Norm (mathematics) – Length in a vector space
- Seminorm – Mathematical function
- Topological vector space – Vector space with a notion of nearness
