= Star domain =

Property of point sets in Euclidean spaces

A star domain (equivalently, a star-convex or star-shaped set) is not necessarily convex in the ordinary sense.

An annulus is not a star domain.

In geometry, a set $S$ in the Euclidean space $\R^n$ is called a star domain (or star-convex set, star-shaped set or radially convex set) if there exists an $s_0 \in S$ such that for all $s \in S,$ the line segment from $s_0$ to $s$ lies in $S.$ This definition is immediately generalizable to any real, or complex, vector space.

Intuitively, if one thinks of $S$ as a region surrounded by a wall, $S$ is a star domain if one can find a vantage point $s_0$ in $S$ from which any point $s$ in $S$ is within line-of-sight. A similar, but distinct, concept is that of a radial set.

== Definition ==
Given two points $x$ and $y$ in a vector space $X$ (such as Euclidean space $\R^n$), the convex hull of $\{x, y\}$ is called the closed interval with endpoints $x$ and $y$ and it is denoted by
$$\left[x, y\right] ~:=~ \left\{t y + (1 - t) x : 0 \leq t \leq 1\right\} ~=~ x + (y - x) [0, 1],$$
where $z [0, 1] := \{z t : 0 \leq t \leq 1\}$ for every vector $z.$

A subset $S$ of a vector space $X$ is said to be star-shaped at $s_0 \in S$ if for every $s \in S,$ the closed interval $\left[s_0, s\right] \subseteq S.$ A set $S$ is star shaped and is called a star domain if there exists some point $s_0 \in S$ such that $S$ is star-shaped at $s_0.$

A set that is star-shaped at the origin is sometimes called a star set. Such sets are closely related to Minkowski functionals.

== Examples ==
- Any line or plane in $\R^n$ is a star domain.
- A line or a plane with a single point removed is not a star domain.
- If $A$ is a set in $\R^n,$ the set $B = \{t a : a \in A, t \in [0, 1]\}$ obtained by connecting all points in $A$ to the origin is a star domain.
- A cross-shaped figure is a star domain but is not convex.
- A star-shaped polygon is a star domain whose boundary is a sequence of connected line segments.

== Properties ==
- Convexity: any non-empty convex set is a star domain. A set is convex if and only if it is a star domain with respect to each point in that set.
- Closure and interior: The closure of a star domain is a star domain, but the interior of a star domain is not necessarily a star domain.
- Contraction: Every star domain is a contractible set, via a straight-line homotopy. In particular, any star domain is a simply connected set.
- Shrinking: Every star domain, and only a star domain, can be "shrunken into itself"; that is, for every dilation ratio $r < 1,$ the star domain can be dilated by a ratio $r$ such that the dilated star domain is contained in the original star domain.
- Union and intersection: The union or intersection of two star domains is not necessarily a star domain.
- Balance: Given $W \subseteq X,$ the set $\bigcap_{|u|=1} u W$ (where $u$ ranges over all unit length scalars) is a balanced set whenever $W$ is a star shaped at the origin (meaning that $0 \in W$ and $r w \in W$ for all $0 \leq r \leq 1$ and $w \in W$).
- Diffeomorphism: A non-empty open star domain $S$ in $\R^n$ is diffeomorphic to $\R^n.$
- Binary operators: If $A$ and $B$ are star domains, then so is the Cartesian product $A\times B$, and the sum $A + B$.
- Linear transformations: If $A$ is a star domain, then so is every linear transformation of $A$.

== See also ==
- Absolutely convex set – Convex and balanced set
- Absorbing set – Set that can be "inflated" to reach any point
- Art gallery problem – Mathematical problem
- Balanced set – Construct in functional analysis
- Bounded set (topological vector space) – Generalization of boundedness
- Convex set – In geometry, set whose intersection with every line is a single line segment
- Minkowski functional – Function made from a set
- Radial set – Topological set
- Star polygon – Regular non-convex polygon
- Symmetric set – Property of group subsets (mathematics)
- Star-shaped preferences
