= Seminorm =

Mathematical function

In mathematics, particularly in functional analysis, a seminorm is like a norm but need not be positive definite. Seminorms are intimately connected with convex sets: every seminorm is the Minkowski functional of some absorbing disk and, conversely, the Minkowski functional of any such set is a seminorm.

A topological vector space is locally convex if and only if its topology is induced by a family of seminorms.

== Definition ==
Let $X$ be a vector space over either the real numbers $\R$ or the complex numbers $\Complex.$ A real-valued function $p : X \to \R$ is called a seminorm if it satisfies the following two conditions:

1. Subadditivity/Triangle inequality: $p(x + y) \leq p(x) + p(y)$ for all $x, y \in X.$
2. Absolute homogeneity: $p(s x) =|s|p(x)$ for all $x \in X$ and all scalars $s.$

These two conditions imply that $p(0) = 0$ (Note: If $z \in X$ denotes the zero vector in $X$ while $0$ denote the zero scalar, then absolute homogeneity implies that $p(z) = p(0 z) = |0|p(z) = 0 p(z) = 0.$ $\blacksquare$) and that every seminorm $p$ also has the following property: (Note: Suppose $p : X \to \R$ is a seminorm and let $x \in X.$ Then absolute homogeneity implies $p(-x) = p((-1) x) =|-1|p(x) = p(x).$ The triangle inequality now implies $p(0) = p(x + (- x)) \leq p(x) + p(-x) = p(x) + p(x) = 2 p(x).$ Because $x$ was an arbitrary vector in $X,$ it follows that $p(0) \leq 2 p(0),$ which implies that $0 \leq p(0)$ (by subtracting $p(0)$ from both sides). Thus $0 \leq p(0) \leq 2 p(x)$ which implies $0 \leq p(x)$ (by multiplying through by $1/2$). $\blacksquare$)

3. Nonnegativity: $p(x) \geq 0$ for all $x \in X.$

Some authors include non-negativity as part of the definition of "seminorm" (and also sometimes of "norm"), although this is not necessary since it follows from the other two properties.

By definition, a norm on $X$ is a seminorm that also separates points, meaning that it has the following additional property:

4. Positive definite/Positive/Point-separating: whenever $x \in X$ satisfies $p(x) = 0,$ then $x = 0.$

A seminormed space is a pair $(X, p)$ consisting of a vector space $X$ and a seminorm $p$ on $X.$ If the seminorm $p$ is also a norm then the seminormed space $(X, p)$ is called a normed space.

Since absolute homogeneity implies positive homogeneity, every seminorm is a type of function called a sublinear function. A map $p : X \to \R$ is called a sublinear function if it is subadditive and positive homogeneous. Unlike a seminorm, a sublinear function is not necessarily nonnegative. Sublinear functions are often encountered in the context of the Hahn–Banach theorem. A real-valued function $p : X \to \R$ is a seminorm if and only if it is a sublinear and balanced function.

== Examples ==
- The trivial seminorm on $X,$ which refers to the constant $0$ map on $X,$ induces the indiscrete topology on $X.$
- Let $\mu$ be a measure on a space $\Omega$. For an arbitrary constant $c \geq 1$, let $X$ be the set of all functions $f: \Omega \rightarrow \mathbb{R}$ for which $\lVert f \rVert_c := \left( \int_{\Omega}| f |^c \, d\mu \right)^{1/c}$ exists and is finite. It can be shown that $X$ is a vector space, and the functional $\lVert \cdot \rVert_c$ is a seminorm on $X$. However, it is not always a norm (e.g. if $\Omega = \mathbb{R}$ and $\mu$ is the Lebesgue measure) because $\lVert h \rVert_c = 0$ does not always imply $h = 0$. To make $\lVert \cdot \rVert_c$ a norm, quotient $X$ by the closed subspace of functions $h$ with $\lVert h \rVert_c = 0$. The resulting space, $L^c(\mu)$, has a norm induced by $\lVert \cdot \rVert_c$.
- If $f$ is any linear form on a vector space then its absolute value $|f|,$ defined by $x \mapsto |f(x)|,$ is a seminorm.
- A sublinear function $f : X \to \R$ on a real vector space $X$ is a seminorm if and only if it is a symmetric function, meaning that $f(-x) = f(x)$ for all $x \in X.$
- Every real-valued sublinear function $f : X \to \R$ on a real vector space $X$ induces a seminorm $p : X \to \R$ defined by $p(x) := \max \{f(x), f(-x)\}.$
- Any finite sum of seminorms is a seminorm. The restriction of a seminorm (respectively, norm) to a vector subspace is once again a seminorm (respectively, norm).
- If $p : X \to \R$ and $q : Y \to \R$ are seminorms (respectively, norms) on $X$ and $Y$ then the map $r : X \times Y \to \R$ defined by $r(x, y) = p(x) + q(y)$ is a seminorm (respectively, a norm) on $X \times Y.$ In particular, the maps on $X \times Y$ defined by $(x, y) \mapsto p(x)$ and $(x, y) \mapsto q(y)$ are both seminorms on $X \times Y.$
- If $p$ and $q$ are seminorms on $X$ then so are $(p \vee q)(x) = \max \{p(x), q(x)\}$ and $(p \wedge q)(x) := \inf \{p(y) + q(z) : x = y + z \text{ with } y, z \in X\}$ where $p \wedge q \leq p$ and $p \wedge q \leq q.$
- The space of seminorms on $X$ is generally not a distributive lattice with respect to the above operations. For example, over $\R^2$, $p(x, y) := \max(|x|, |y|), q(x, y) := 2|x|, r(x, y) := 2|y|$ are such that $((p \vee q) \wedge (p \vee r)) (x, y) = \inf \{\max(2|x_1|, |y_1|) + \max(|x_2|, 2|y_2|) : x = x_1 + x_2 \text{ and } y = y_1 + y_2\}$ while $(p \vee q \wedge r) (x, y) := \max(|x|, |y|)$
- If $L : X \to Y$ is a linear map and $q : Y \to \R$ is a seminorm on $Y,$ then $q \circ L : X \to \R$ is a seminorm on $X.$ The seminorm $q \circ L$ will be a norm on $X$ if and only if $L$ is injective and the restriction $q\big\vert_{L(X)}$ is a norm on $L(X).$

== Minkowski functionals and seminorms ==
Seminorms on a vector space $X$ are intimately tied, via Minkowski functionals, to subsets of $X$ that are convex, balanced, and absorbing. Given such a subset $D$ of $X,$ the Minkowski functional of $D$ is a seminorm. Conversely, given a seminorm $p$ on $X,$ the sets$\{x \in X : p(x) < 1\}$ and $\{x \in X : p(x) \leq 1\}$ are convex, balanced, and absorbing and furthermore, the Minkowski functional of these two sets (as well as of any set lying "in between them") is $p.$

== Algebraic properties ==
Every seminorm is a sublinear function, and thus satisfies all properties of a sublinear function, including convexity, $p(0) = 0,$ and for all vectors $x, y \in X$: the reverse triangle inequality: $|p(x) - p(y)| \leq p(x - y)$ and also $0 \leq \max \{p(x), p(-x)\}$ and $p(x) - p(y) \leq p(x - y).$

For any vector $x \in X$ and positive real $r > 0:$ $x + \{y \in X : p(y) < r\} = \{y \in X : p(x - y) < r\}$ and furthermore, $\{x \in X : p(x) < r\}$ is an absorbing disk in $X.$

If $p$ is a sublinear function on a real vector space $X$ then there exists a linear functional $f$ on $X$ such that $f \leq p$ and furthermore, for any linear functional $g$ on $X,$ $g \leq p$ on $X$ if and only if $g^{-1}(1) \cap \{x \in X : p(x) < 1\} = \varnothing.$

Other properties of seminorms

Every seminorm is a balanced function. A seminorm $p$ is a norm on $X$ if and only if $\{x \in X : p(x) < 1\}$ does not contain a non-trivial vector subspace.

If $p : X \to [0, \infty)$ is a seminorm on $X$ then $\ker p := p^{-1}(0)$ is a vector subspace of $X$ and for every $x \in X,$ $p$ is constant on the set $x + \ker p = \{x + k : p(k) = 0\}$ and equal to $p(x).$ (Note: Let $x \in X$ and $k \in p^{-1}(0).$ It remains to show that $p(x + k) = p(x).$ The triangle inequality implies $p(x + k) \leq p(x) + p(k) = p(x) + 0 = p(x).$ Since $p(-k) = 0,$ $p(x) = p(x) - p(-k) \leq p(x - (-k)) = p(x + k),$ as desired. $\blacksquare$)

Furthermore, for any real $r > 0,$ $r \{x \in X : p(x) < 1\} = \{x \in X : p(x) < r\} = \left\{x \in X : \tfrac{1}{r} p(x) < 1 \right\}.$

If $D$ is a set satisfying $\{x \in X : p(x) < 1\} \subseteq D \subseteq \{x \in X : p(x) \leq 1\}$ then $D$ is absorbing in $X$ and $p = p_D$ where $p_D$ denotes the Minkowski functional associated with $D$ (that is, the gauge of $D$). In particular, if $D$ is as above and $q$ is any seminorm on $X,$ then $q = p$ if and only if $\{x \in X : q(x) < 1\} \subseteq D \subseteq \{x \in X : q(x) \leq\}.$

If $(X, \|\,\cdot\,\|)$ is a normed space and $x, y \in X$ then $\|x - y\| = \|x - z\| + \|z - y\|$ for all $z$ in the interval $[x, y].$

Every norm is a convex function and consequently, finding a global maximum of a norm-based objective function is sometimes tractable.

=== Relationship to other norm-like concepts ===
Let $p : X \to \R$ be a non-negative function. The following are equivalent:

1. $p$ is a seminorm.
2. $p$ is a convex $F$-seminorm.
3. $p$ is a convex balanced G-seminorm.

If any of the above conditions hold, then the following are equivalent:

1. $p$ is a norm;
2. $\{x \in X : p(x) < 1\}$ does not contain a non-trivial vector subspace.
3. There exists a norm on $X,$ with respect to which, $\{x \in X : p(x) < 1\}$ is bounded.

If $p$ is a sublinear function on a real vector space $X$ then the following are equivalent:

1. $p$ is a linear functional;
2. $p(x) + p(-x) \leq 0 \text{ for every } x \in X$;
3. $p(x) + p(-x) = 0 \text{ for every } x \in X$;

=== Inequalities involving seminorms ===
If $p, q : X \to [0, \infty)$ are seminorms on $X$ then:

- $p \leq q$ if and only if $q(x) \leq 1$ implies $p(x) \leq 1.$
- If $a > 0$ and $b > 0$ are such that $p(x) < a$ implies $q(x) \leq b,$ then $a q(x) \leq b p(x)$ for all $x \in X.$
- Suppose $a$ and $b$ are positive real numbers and $q, p_1, \ldots, p_n$ are seminorms on $X$ such that for every $x \in X,$ if $\max \{p_1(x), \ldots, p_n(x)\} < a$ then $q(x) < b.$ Then $a q \leq b \left(p_1 + \cdots + p_n\right).$
- If $X$ is a vector space over the reals and $f$ is a non-zero linear functional on $X,$ then $f \leq p$ if and only if $\varnothing = f^{-1}(1) \cap \{x \in X : p(x) < 1\}.$

If $p$ is a seminorm on $X$ and $f$ is a linear functional on $X$ then:

- $|f| \leq p$ on $X$ if and only if $\operatorname{Re} f \leq p$ on $X$ (see footnote for proof).
- $f \leq p$ on $X$ if and only if $f^{-1}(1) \cap \{x \in X : p(x) < 1 = \varnothing\}.$
- If $a > 0$ and $b > 0$ are such that $p(x) < a$ implies $f(x) \neq b,$ then $a |f(x)| \leq b p(x)$ for all $x \in X.$

=== Hahn–Banach theorem for seminorms ===
Seminorms offer a particularly clean formulation of the Hahn–Banach theorem:

If $M$ is a vector subspace of a seminormed space $(X, p)$ and if $f$ is a continuous linear functional on $M,$ then $f$ may be extended to a continuous linear functional $F$ on $X$ that has the same norm as $f.$

A similar extension property also holds for seminorms:

Theorem (Extending seminorms)—If $M$ is a vector subspace of $X,$ $p$ is a seminorm on $M,$ and $q$ is a seminorm on $X$ such that $p \leq q\big\vert_M,$ then there exists a seminorm $P$ on $X$ such that $P\big\vert_M = p$ and $P \leq q.$

Proof: Let $S$ be the convex hull of $\{m \in M : p(m) \leq 1\} \cup \{x \in X : q(x) \leq 1\}.$ Then $S$ is an absorbing disk in $X$ and so the Minkowski functional $P$ of $S$ is a seminorm on $X.$ This seminorm satisfies $p = P$ on $M$ and $P \leq q$ on $X.$ $\blacksquare$

== Topologies of seminormed spaces ==
=== Pseudometrics and the induced topology ===
A seminorm $p$ on $X$ induces a topology, called the seminorm-induced topology, via the canonical translation-invariant pseudometric $d_p : X \times X \to \R$; $d_p(x, y) := p(x - y) = p(y - x).$ This topology is Hausdorff if and only if $d_p$ is a metric, which occurs if and only if $p$ is a norm. This topology makes $X$ into a locally convex pseudometrizable topological vector space that has a bounded neighborhood of the origin and a neighborhood basis at the origin consisting of the following open balls (or the closed balls) centered at the origin: $\{x \in X : p(x) < r\} \quad \text{ or } \quad \{x \in X : p(x) \leq r\}$ as $r > 0$ ranges over the positive reals. Every seminormed space $(X, p)$ should be assumed to be endowed with this topology unless indicated otherwise. A topological vector space whose topology is induced by some seminorm is called seminormable.

Equivalently, every vector space $X$ with seminorm $p$ induces a vector space quotient $X / W,$ where $W$ is the subspace of $X$ consisting of all vectors $x \in X$ with $p(x) = 0.$ Then $X / W$ carries a norm defined by $p(x + W) = p(x).$ The resulting topology, pulled back to $X,$ is precisely the topology induced by $p.$

Any seminorm-induced topology makes $X$ locally convex, as follows. If $p$ is a seminorm on $X$ and $r \in \R,$ call the set $\{x \in X : p(x) < r\}$ the open ball of radius $r$ about the origin; likewise the closed ball of radius $r$ is $\{x \in X : p(x) \leq r\}.$ The set of all open (resp. closed) $p$-balls at the origin forms a neighborhood basis of convex balanced sets that are open (resp. closed) in the $p$-topology on $X.$

==== Stronger, weaker, and equivalent seminorms ====
The notions of stronger and weaker seminorms are akin to the notions of stronger and weaker norms. If $p$ and $q$ are seminorms on $X,$ then we say that $q$ is stronger than $p$ and that $p$ is weaker than $q$ if any of the following equivalent conditions holds:

1. The topology on $X$ induced by $q$ is finer than the topology induced by $p.$
2. If $x_{\bull} = \left(x_i\right)_{i=1}^{\infty}$ is a sequence in $X,$ then $q\left(x_{\bull}\right) := \left(q\left(x_i\right)\right)_{i=1}^{\infty} \to 0$ in $\R$ implies $p\left(x_{\bull}\right) \to 0$ in $\R.$
3. If $x_{\bull} = \left(x_i\right)_{i \in I}$ is a net in $X,$ then $q\left(x_{\bull}\right) := \left(q\left(x_i\right)\right)_{i \in I} \to 0$ in $\R$ implies $p\left(x_{\bull}\right) \to 0$ in $\R.$
4. $p$ is bounded on $\{x \in X : q(x) < 1\}.$
5. If $\inf{} \{q(x) : p(x) = 1, x \in X\} = 0$ then $p(x) = 0$ for all $x \in X.$
6. There exists a real $K > 0$ such that $p \leq K q$ on $X.$

The seminorms $p$ and $q$ are called equivalent if they are both weaker (or both stronger) than each other. This happens if they satisfy any of the following conditions:

1. The topology on $X$ induced by $q$ is the same as the topology induced by $p.$
2. $q$ is stronger than $p$ and $p$ is stronger than $q.$
3. If $x_{\bull} = \left(x_i\right)_{i=1}^{\infty}$ is a sequence in $X$ then $q\left(x_{\bull}\right) := \left(q\left(x_i\right)\right)_{i=1}^{\infty} \to 0$ if and only if $p\left(x_{\bull}\right) \to 0.$
4. There exist positive real numbers $r > 0$ and $R > 0$ such that $r q \leq p \leq R q.$

=== Normability and seminormability ===
A topological vector space (TVS) is said to be a seminormable space (respectively, a normable space) if its topology is induced by a single seminorm (resp. a single norm). A TVS is normable if and only if it is seminormable and Hausdorff or equivalently, if and only if it is seminormable and T_{1} (because a TVS is Hausdorff if and only if it is a T_{1} space). A locally bounded topological vector space is a topological vector space that possesses a bounded neighborhood of the origin.

Normability of topological vector spaces is characterized by Kolmogorov's normability criterion. A TVS is seminormable if and only if it has a convex bounded neighborhood of the origin. Thus a locally convex TVS is seminormable if and only if it has a non-empty bounded open set. A TVS is normable if and only if it is a T_{1} space and admits a bounded convex neighborhood of the origin.

If $X$ is a Hausdorff locally convex TVS then the following are equivalent:

1. $X$ is normable.
2. $X$ is seminormable.
3. $X$ has a bounded neighborhood of the origin.
4. The strong dual $X^{\prime}_b$ of $X$ is normable.
5. The strong dual $X^{\prime}_b$ of $X$ is metrizable.

Furthermore, $X$ is finite dimensional if and only if $X^{\prime}_{\sigma}$ is normable (here $X^{\prime}_{\sigma}$ denotes $X^{\prime}$ endowed with the weak-* topology).

The product of infinitely many seminormable space is again seminormable if and only if all but finitely many of these spaces trivial (that is, 0-dimensional).

=== Topological properties ===
- If $X$ is a TVS and $p$ is a continuous seminorm on $X,$ then the closure of $\{x \in X : p(x) < r\}$ in $X$ is equal to $\{x \in X : p(x) \leq r\}.$
- The closure of $\{0\}$ in a locally convex space $X$ whose topology is defined by a family of continuous seminorms $\mathcal{P}$ is equal to $\bigcap_{p \in \mathcal{P}} p^{-1}(0).$
- A subset $S$ in a seminormed space $(X, p)$ is bounded if and only if $p(S)$ is bounded.
- If $(X, p)$ is a seminormed space then the locally convex topology that $p$ induces on $X$ makes $X$ into a pseudometrizable TVS with a canonical pseudometric given by $d(x, y) := p(x - y)$ for all $x, y \in X.$
- The product of infinitely many seminormable spaces is again seminormable if and only if all but finitely many of these spaces are trivial (that is, 0-dimensional).

=== Continuity of seminorms ===
If $p$ is a seminorm on a topological vector space $X,$ then the following are equivalent:

1. $p$ is continuous.
2. $p$ is continuous at 0;
3. $\{x \in X : p(x) < 1\}$ is open in $X$;
4. $\{x \in X : p(x) \leq 1\}$ is closed neighborhood of 0 in $X$;
5. $p$ is uniformly continuous on $X$;
6. There exists a continuous seminorm $q$ on $X$ such that $p \leq q.$

In particular, if $(X, p)$ is a seminormed space then a seminorm $q$ on $X$ is continuous if and only if $q$ is dominated by a positive scalar multiple of $p.$

If $X$ is a real TVS, $f$ is a linear functional on $X,$ and $p$ is a continuous seminorm (or more generally, a sublinear function) on $X,$ then $f \leq p$ on $X$ implies that $f$ is continuous.

=== Continuity of linear maps ===
If $F : (X, p) \to (Y, q)$ is a map between seminormed spaces then let $\|F\|_{p,q} := \sup \{q(F(x)) : p(x) \leq 1, x \in X\}.$

If $F : (X, p) \to (Y, q)$ is a linear map between seminormed spaces then the following are equivalent:

1. $F$ is continuous;
2. $\|F\|_{p,q} < \infty$;
3. There exists a real $K \geq 0$ such that $p \leq K q$;
  - In this case, $\|F\|_{p,q} \leq K.$

If $F$ is continuous then $q(F(x)) \leq \|F\|_{p,q} p(x)$ for all $x \in X.$

The space of all continuous linear maps $F : (X, p) \to (Y, q)$ between seminormed spaces is itself a seminormed space under the seminorm $\|F\|_{p,q}.$ This seminorm is a norm if $q$ is a norm.

== Generalizations ==
The concept of norm in composition algebras does not share the usual properties of a norm.

A composition algebra $(A, *, N)$ consists of an algebra over a field $A,$ an involution $\,*,$ and a quadratic form $N,$ which is called the "norm". In several cases $N$ is an isotropic quadratic form so that $A$ has at least one null vector, contrary to the separation of points required for the usual norm discussed in this article.

An ultraseminorm or a non-Archimedean seminorm is a seminorm $p : X \to \R$ that also satisfies $p(x + y) \leq \max \{p(x), p(y)\} \text{ for all } x, y \in X.$

Weakening subadditivity: Quasi-seminorms

A map $p : X \to \R$ is called a quasi-seminorm if it is (absolutely) homogeneous and there exists some $b \leq 1$ such that $p(x + y) \leq b p(p(x) + p(y)) \text{ for all } x, y \in X.$ The smallest value of $b$ for which this holds is called the multiplier of $p.$

A quasi-seminorm that separates points is called a quasi-norm on $X.$

Weakening homogeneity - $k$-seminorms

A map $p : X \to \R$ is called a $k$-seminorm if it is subadditive and there exists a $k$ such that $0 < k \leq 1$ and for all $x \in X$ and scalars $s,$$p(s x) = |s|^k p(x)$ A $k$-seminorm that separates points is called a $k$-norm on $X.$

We have the following relationship between quasi-seminorms and $k$-seminorms:

Suppose that $q$ is a quasi-seminorm on a vector space $X$ with multiplier $b.$ If $0 < \sqrt{k} < \log_2 b$ then there exists $k$-seminorm $p$ on $X$ equivalent to $q.$

== See also ==
- Asymmetric norm – Generalization of the concept of a norm
- Banach space – Normed vector space that is complete
- Contraction mapping – Function reducing distance between all points
- Finest locally convex topology – Vector space with a topology defined by convex open sets
- Hahn-Banach theorem – Theorem on extension of bounded linear functionals
- Gowers norm – Class of norms in additive combinatorics
- Locally convex topological vector space – Vector space with a topology defined by convex open sets
- Mahalanobis distance – Statistical distance measure
- Matrix norm – Norm on a vector space of matrices
- Minkowski functional – Function made from a set
- Norm (mathematics) – Length in a vector space
- Normed vector space – Vector space on which a distance is defined
- Relation of norms and metrics – Mathematical space with a notion of distance
- Sublinear function – Type of function in linear algebra

== Notes ==
Proofs
