= Symmetric set =

Property of group subsets (mathematics)

In mathematics, a nonempty subset S of a group G is said to be symmetric if it contains the inverses of all of its elements.

== Definition ==
In set notation a subset $S$ of a group $G$ is called symmetric if whenever $s \in S$ then the inverse of $s$ also belongs to $S.$ So if $G$ is written multiplicatively then $S$ is symmetric if and only if $S = S^{-1}$ where $S^{-1} := \left\{ s^{-1} : s \in S \right\}.$ If $G$ is written additively then $S$ is symmetric if and only if $S = - S$ where $- S := \{- s : s \in S\}.$

If $S$ is a subset of a vector space then $S$ is said to be a symmetric set if it is symmetric with respect to the additive group structure of the vector space; that is, if $S = - S,$ which happens if and only if $- S \subseteq S.$ The symmetric hull of a subset $S$ is the smallest symmetric set containing $S,$ and it is equal to $S \cup - S.$ The largest symmetric set contained in $S$ is $S \cap - S.$

== Sufficient conditions ==
Arbitrary unions and intersections of symmetric sets are symmetric.

Any vector subspace in a vector space is a symmetric set.

== Examples ==
In $\R,$ examples of symmetric sets are intervals of the type $(-k, k)$ with $k > 0,$ and the sets $\Z$ and $(-1, 1).$

If $S$ is any subset of a group, then $S \cup S^{-1}$ and $S \cap S^{-1}$ are symmetric sets.

Any balanced subset of a real or complex vector space is symmetric.

== See also ==
- Absolutely convex set – Convex and balanced set
- Absorbing set – Set that can be "inflated" to reach any point
- Balanced function – Construct in functional analysis
- Balanced set – Construct in functional analysis
- Bounded set (topological vector space) – Generalization of boundedness
- Convex set – In geometry, set whose intersection with every line is a single line segment
- Minkowski functional – Function made from a set
- Star domain – Property of point sets in Euclidean spaces
