= Balanced set =

Construct in functional analysis

In linear algebra and related areas of mathematics a balanced set, circled set or disk in a vector space (over a field $\mathbb{K}$ with an absolute value function $|\cdot |$) is a set $S$ such that $a S \subseteq S$ for all scalars $a$ satisfying $|a| \leq 1.$

The balanced hull or balanced envelope of a set $S$ is the smallest balanced set containing $S.$ The balanced core of a set $S$ is the largest balanced set contained in $S.$

Balanced sets are ubiquitous in functional analysis because every neighborhood of the origin in every topological vector space (TVS) contains a balanced neighborhood of the origin and every convex neighborhood of the origin contains a balanced convex neighborhood of the origin (even if the TVS is not locally convex). This neighborhood can also be chosen to be an open set or, alternatively, a closed set.

== Definition ==
Let $X$ be a vector space over the field $\mathbb{K}$ of real or complex numbers.

Notation

If $S$ is a set, $a$ is a scalar, and $B \subseteq \mathbb{K}$ then let $a S = \{a s : s \in S\}$ and $B S = \{b s : b \in B, s \in S\}$ and for any $0 \leq r \leq \infty,$ let
$$B_r = \{a \in \mathbb{K} : |a| < r\} \qquad \text{ and } \qquad B_{\leq r} = \{ a \in \mathbb{K} : |a| \leq r\}.$$
denote, respectively, the open ball and the closed ball of radius $r$ in the scalar field $\mathbb{K}$ centered at $0$ where $B_0 = \varnothing, B_{\leq 0} = \{0\},$ and $B_{\infty} = B_{\leq \infty} = \mathbb{K}.$ Every balanced subset of the field $\mathbb{K}$ is of the form $B_{\leq r}$ or $B_r$ for some $0 \leq r \leq \infty.$

Balanced set

A subset $S$ of $X$ is called a balanced set or balanced if it satisfies any of the following equivalent conditions:

1. Definition: $a s \in S$ for all $s \in S$ and all scalars $a$ satisfying $|a| \leq 1.$
2. $a S \subseteq S$ for all scalars $a$ satisfying $|a| \leq 1.$
3. $B_{\leq 1} S \subseteq S$ (where $B_{\leq 1} := \{a \in \mathbb{K} : |a| \leq 1\}$).
4. $S = B_{\leq 1} S.$
5. For every $s \in S,$ $S \cap \mathbb{K} s = B_{\leq 1} (S \cap \mathbb{K} s).$
  - $\mathbb{K} s = \operatorname{span} \{s\}$ is a $0$ (if $s = 0$) or $1$ (if $s \neq 0$) dimensional vector subspace of $X.$
  - If $R := S \cap \mathbb{K} s$ then the above equality becomes $R = B_{\leq 1} R,$ which is exactly the previous condition for a set to be balanced. Thus, $S$ is balanced if and only if for every $s \in S,$ $S \cap \mathbb{K} s$ is a balanced set (according to any of the previous defining conditions).
6. For every 1-dimensional vector subspace $Y$ of $\operatorname{span} S,$ $S \cap Y$ is a balanced set (according to any defining condition other than this one).
7. For every $s \in S,$ there exists some $0 \leq r \leq \infty$ such that $S \cap \mathbb{K} s = B_r s$ or $S \cap \mathbb{K} s = B_{\leq r} s.$
8. $S$ is a balanced subset of $\operatorname{span} S$ (according to any defining condition of "balanced" other than this one).
  - Thus $S$ is a balanced subset of $X$ if and only if it is balanced subset of every (equivalently, of some) vector space over the field $\mathbb{K}$ that contains $S.$ So assuming that the field $\mathbb{K}$ is clear from context, this justifies writing "$S$ is balanced" without mentioning any vector space. (Note: Assuming that all vector spaces containing a set $S$ are over the same field, when describing the set as being "balanced", it is not necessary to mention a vector space containing $S.$ That is, "$S$ is balanced" may be written in place of "$S$ is a balanced subset of $X$".)

If $S$ is a convex set then this list may be extended to include:

9. $a S \subseteq S$ for all scalars $a$ satisfying $|a| = 1.$

If $\mathbb{K} = \R$ then this list may be extended to include:

10. $S$ is symmetric (meaning $- S = S$) and $[0, 1) S \subseteq S.$

=== Balanced hull ===
$$\operatorname{bal} S ~=~ \bigcup_{|a| \leq 1} a S = B_{\leq 1} S$$

The balanced hull of a subset $S$ of $X,$ denoted by $\operatorname{bal} S,$ is defined in any of the following equivalent ways:

1. Definition: $\operatorname{bal} S$ is the smallest (with respect to $\,\subseteq\,$) balanced subset of $X$ containing $S.$
2. $\operatorname{bal} S$ is the intersection of all balanced sets containing $S.$
3. $\operatorname{bal} S = \bigcup_{|a| \leq 1} (a S).$
4. $\operatorname{bal} S = B_{\leq 1} S.$

=== Balanced core ===
$$\operatorname{balcore} S ~=~ \begin{cases}
\displaystyle\bigcap_{|a| \geq 1} a S & \text{ if } 0 \in S \\
\varnothing              & \text{ if } 0 \not\in S \\
\end{cases}$$

The balanced core of a subset $S$ of $X,$ denoted by $\operatorname{balcore} S,$ is defined in any of the following equivalent ways:

1. Definition: $\operatorname{balcore} S$ is the largest (with respect to $\,\subseteq\,$) balanced subset of $S.$
2. $\operatorname{balcore} S$ is the union of all balanced subsets of $S.$
3. $\operatorname{balcore} S = \varnothing$ if $0 \not\in S$ while $\operatorname{balcore} S = \bigcap_{|a| \geq 1} (a S)$ if $0 \in S.$

== Examples ==
The empty set is a balanced set. As is any vector subspace of any (real or complex) vector space. In particular, $\{0\}$ is always a balanced set.

Any non-empty set that does not contain the origin is not balanced and furthermore, the balanced core of such a set will equal the empty set.

Normed and topological vector spaces

The open and closed balls centered at the origin in a normed vector space are balanced sets. If $p$ is a seminorm (or norm) on a vector space $X$ then for any constant $c > 0,$ the set $\{x \in X : p(x) \leq c\}$ is balanced.

If $S \subseteq X$ is any subset and $B_1 := \{a \in \mathbb{K} : |a| < 1\}$ then $B_1 S$ is a balanced set. In particular, if $U \subseteq X$ is any balanced neighborhood of the origin in a topological vector space $X$ then
$$\operatorname{Int}_X U ~\subseteq~ B_1 U ~=~ \bigcup_{0 < |a| < 1} a U ~\subseteq~ U.$$

Balanced sets in $\R$ and $\Complex$

Let $\mathbb{K}$ be the field real numbers $\R$ or complex numbers $\Complex,$ let $|\cdot|$ denote the absolute value on $\mathbb{K},$ and let $X := \mathbb{K}$ denotes the vector space over $\mathbb{K}.$ So for example, if $\mathbb{K} := \Complex$ is the field of complex numbers then $X = \mathbb{K} = \Complex$ is a 1-dimensional complex vector space whereas if $\mathbb{K} := \R$ then $X = \mathbb{K} = \R$ is a 1-dimensional real vector space.

The balanced subsets of $X = \mathbb{K}$ are exactly the following:

1. $\varnothing$
2. $X$
3. $\{0\}$
4. $\{x \in X : |x| < r\}$ for some real $r > 0$
5. $\{x \in X : |x| \leq r\}$ for some real $r > 0.$

Consequently, both the balanced core and the balanced hull of every set of scalars is equal to one of the sets listed above.

The balanced sets are $\Complex$ itself, the empty set and the open and closed discs centered at zero. Contrariwise, in the two dimensional Euclidean space there are many more balanced sets: any line segment with midpoint at the origin will do. As a result, $\Complex$ and $\R^2$ are entirely different as far as scalar multiplication is concerned.

Balanced sets in $\R^2$

Throughout, let $X = \R^2$ (so $X$ is a vector space over $\R$) and let $B_{\leq 1}$ is the closed unit ball in $X$ centered at the origin.

If $x_0 \in X = \R^2$ is non-zero, and $L := \R x_0,$ then the set $R := B_{\leq 1} \cup L$ is a closed, symmetric, and balanced neighborhood of the origin in $X.$ More generally, if $C$ is any closed subset of $X$ such that $(0, 1) C \subseteq C,$ then $S := B_{\leq 1} \cup C \cup (-C)$ is a closed, symmetric, and balanced neighborhood of the origin in $X.$ This example can be generalized to $\R^n$ for any integer $n \geq 1.$

Let $B \subseteq \R^2$ be the union of the line segment between the points $(-1, 0)$ and $(1, 0)$ and the line segment between $(0, -1)$ and $(0, 1).$ Then $B$ is balanced but not convex. Nor is $B$ is absorbing (despite the fact that $\operatorname{span} B = \R^2$ is the entire vector space).

For every $0 \leq t \leq \pi,$ let $r_t$ be any positive real number and let $B^t$ be the (open or closed) line segment in $X := \R^2$ between the points $(\cos t, \sin t)$ and $- (\cos t, \sin t).$ Then the set $B = \bigcup_{0 \leq t < \pi} r_t B^t$ is a balanced and absorbing set but it is not necessarily convex.

The balanced hull of a closed set need not be closed. Take for instance the graph of $x y = 1$ in $X = \R^2.$

The next example shows that the balanced hull of a convex set may fail to be convex (however, the convex hull of a balanced set is always balanced). For an example, let the convex subset be $S := [-1, 1] \times \{1\},$ which is a horizontal closed line segment lying above the $x-$axis in $X := \R^2.$ The balanced hull $\operatorname{bal} S$ is a non-convex subset that is "hour glass shaped" and equal to the union of two closed and filled isosceles triangles $T_1$ and $T_2,$ where $T_2 = - T_1$ and $T_1$ is the filled triangle whose vertices are the origin together with the endpoints of $S$ (said differently, $T_1$ is the convex hull of $S \cup \{(0,0)\}$ while $T_2$ is the convex hull of $(-S) \cup \{(0,0)\}$).

=== Sufficient conditions ===
A set $T$ is balanced if and only if it is equal to its balanced hull $\operatorname{bal} T$ or to its balanced core $\operatorname{balcore} T,$ in which case all three of these sets are equal: $T = \operatorname{bal} T = \operatorname{balcore} T.$

The Cartesian product of a family of balanced sets is balanced in the product space of the corresponding vector spaces (over the same field $\mathbb{K}$).

- The balanced hull of a compact (respectively, totally bounded, bounded) set has the same property.
- The convex hull of a balanced set is convex and balanced (that is, it is absolutely convex). However, the balanced hull of a convex set may fail to be convex (a counter-example is given above).
- Arbitrary unions of balanced sets are balanced, and the same is true of arbitrary intersections of balanced sets.
- Scalar multiples and (finite) Minkowski sums of balanced sets are again balanced.
- Images and preimages of balanced sets under linear maps are again balanced. Explicitly, if $L : X \to Y$ is a linear map and $B \subseteq X$ and $C \subseteq Y$ are balanced sets, then $L(B)$ and $L^{-1}(C)$ are balanced sets.

=== Balanced neighborhoods ===
In any topological vector space, the closure of a balanced set is balanced. The union of the origin $\{0\}$ and the topological interior of a balanced set is balanced. Therefore, the topological interior of a balanced neighborhood of the origin is balanced. (Note: Let $B \subseteq X$ be balanced. If its topological interior $\operatorname{Int}_X B$ is empty then it is balanced so assume otherwise and let $|s| \leq 1$ be a scalar. If $s \neq 0$ then the map $X \to X$ defined by $x \mapsto s x$ is a homeomorphism, which implies $s \operatorname{Int}_X B = \operatorname{Int}_X (s B) \subseteq s B \subseteq B;$ because $s \operatorname{Int}_X B$ is open, $s \operatorname{Int}_X B \subseteq \operatorname{Int}_X B$ so that it only remains to show that this is true for $s = 0.$ However, $0 \in \operatorname{Int}_X B$ might not be true but when it is true then $\operatorname{Int}_X B$ will be balanced. $\blacksquare$) However, $\left\{(z, w) \in \Complex^2 : |z| \leq |w|\right\}$ is a balanced subset of $X = \Complex^2$ that contains the origin $(0, 0) \in X$ but whose (nonempty) topological interior does not contain the origin and is therefore not a balanced set. Similarly for real vector spaces, if $T$ denotes the convex hull of $(0, 0)$ and $(\pm 1, 1)$ (a filled triangle whose vertices are these three points) then $B := T \cup (-T)$ is an (hour glass shaped) balanced subset of $X := \Reals^2$ whose non-empty topological interior does not contain the origin and so is not a balanced set (and although the set $\{(0, 0)\} \cup \operatorname{Int}_X B$ formed by adding the origin is balanced, it is neither an open set nor a neighborhood of the origin).

Every neighborhood (respectively, convex neighborhood) of the origin in a topological vector space $X$ contains a balanced (respectively, convex and balanced) open neighborhood of the origin. In fact, the following construction produces such balanced sets. Given $W \subseteq X,$ the symmetric set $\bigcap_{|u|=1} u W \subseteq W$ will be convex (respectively, closed, balanced, bounded, a neighborhood of the origin, an absorbing subset of $X$) whenever this is true of $W.$ It will be a balanced set if $W$ is a star shaped at the origin, (Note: $W$ being star shaped at the origin means that $0 \in W$ and $r w \in W$ for all $0 \leq r \leq 1$ and $w \in W.$) which is true, for instance, when $W$ is convex and contains $0.$ In particular, if $W$ is a convex neighborhood of the origin then $\bigcap_{|u|=1} u W$ will be a balanced convex neighborhood of the origin and so its topological interior will be a balanced convex open neighborhood of the origin.

Proof

Let $0 \in W \subseteq X$ and define $A = \bigcap_{|u|=1} u W$ (where $u$ denotes elements of the field $\mathbb{K}$ of scalars). Taking $u := 1$ shows that $A \subseteq W.$ If $W$ is convex then so is $A$ (since an intersection of convex sets is convex) and thus so is $A$'s interior. If $|s| = 1$ then
$$s A = \bigcap_{|u|=1} s u W \subseteq \bigcap_{|u|=1} u W = A$$
and thus $s A = A.$ If $W$ is star shaped at the origin then so is every $u W$ (for $|u| = 1$), which implies that for any $0 \leq r \leq 1,$
$$r A = \bigcap_{|u|=1} r u W \subseteq \bigcap_{|u|=1} u W = A$$
thus proving that $A$ is balanced. If $W$ is convex and contains the origin then it is star shaped at the origin and so $A$ will be balanced.

Now suppose $W$ is a neighborhood of the origin in $X.$ Since scalar multiplication $M : \mathbb{K} \times X \to X$ (defined by $M(a, x) = a x$) is continuous at the origin $(0, 0) \in \mathbb{K} \times X$ and $M(0, 0) = 0 \in W,$ there exists some basic open neighborhood $B_r \times V$ (where $r > 0$ and $B_r := \{c \in \mathbb{K} : |c| < r\}$) of the origin in the product topology on $\mathbb{K} \times X$ such that $M\left(B_r \times V\right) \subseteq W;$ the set $M\left(B_r \times V\right) = B_r V$ is balanced and it is also open because it may be written as
$$B_r V = \bigcup_{|a| < r} a V = \bigcup_{0 < |a| < r} a V \qquad \text{ (since } 0 \cdot V = \{0\} \subseteq a V \text{ )}$$
where $a V$ is an open neighborhood of the origin whenever $a \neq 0.$ Finally,
$$A = \bigcap_{|u|=1} u W \supseteq \bigcap_{|u|=1} u B_r V = \bigcap_{|u|=1} B_r V = B_r V$$
shows that $A$ is also a neighborhood of the origin. If $A$ is balanced then because its interior $\operatorname{Int}_X A$ contains the origin, $\operatorname{Int}_X A$ will also be balanced. If $W$ is convex then $A$ is convex and balanced and thus the same is true of $\operatorname{Int}_X A.$ $\blacksquare$

Suppose that $W$ is a convex and absorbing subset of $X.$ Then $D := \bigcap_{|u|=1} u W$ will be convex balanced absorbing subset of $X,$ which guarantees that the Minkowski functional $p_D : X \to \R$ of $D$ will be a seminorm on $X,$ thereby making $\left(X, p_D\right)$ into a seminormed space that carries its canonical pseduometrizable topology. The set of scalar multiples $r D$ as $r$ ranges over $\left\{\tfrac{1}{2}, \tfrac{1}{3}, \tfrac{1}{4}, \ldots\right\}$ (or over any other set of non-zero scalars having $0$ as a limit point) forms a neighborhood basis of absorbing disks at the origin for this locally convex topology. If $X$ is a topological vector space and if this convex absorbing subset $W$ is also a bounded subset of $X,$ then the same will be true of the absorbing disk $D := {\textstyle\bigcap\limits_{|u|=1}} u W;$ if in addition $D$ does not contain any non-trivial vector subspace then $p_D$ will be a norm and $\left(X, p_D\right)$ will form what is known as an auxiliary normed space. If this normed space is a Banach space then $D$ is called a Banach disk.

== Properties ==
Properties of balanced sets

A balanced set is not empty if and only if it contains the origin. By definition, a set is absolutely convex if and only if it is convex and balanced. Every balanced set is star-shaped (at 0) and a symmetric set. If $B$ is a balanced subset of $X$ then:

- for any scalars $c$ and $d,$ if $|c| \leq |d|$ then $c B \subseteq d B$ and $c B = |c| B.$ Thus if $c$ and $d$ are any scalars then $(c B) \cap (d B) = \min_{} \{|c|, |d|\} B.$
- $B$ is absorbing in $X$ if and only if for all $x \in X,$ there exists $r > 0$ such that $x \in r B.$
- for any 1-dimensional vector subspace $Y$ of $X,$ the set $B \cap Y$ is convex and balanced. If $B$ is not empty and if $Y$ is a 1-dimensional vector subspace of $\operatorname{span} B$ then $B \cap Y$ is either $\{0\}$ or else it is absorbing in $Y.$
- for any $x \in X,$ if $B \cap \operatorname{span} x$ contains more than one point then it is a convex and balanced neighborhood of $0$ in the 1-dimensional vector space $\operatorname{span} x$ when this space is endowed with the Hausdorff Euclidean topology; and the set $B \cap \R x$ is a convex balanced subset of the real vector space $\R x$ that contains the origin.

Properties of balanced hulls and balanced cores

For any collection $\mathcal{S}$ of subsets of $X,$
$$\operatorname{bal} \left(\bigcup_{S \in \mathcal{S}} S\right) = \bigcup_{S \in \mathcal{S}} \operatorname{bal} S
\quad \text{ and } \quad \operatorname{balcore} \left(\bigcap_{S \in \mathcal{S}} S\right) = \bigcap_{S \in \mathcal{S}} \operatorname{balcore} S.$$

In any topological vector space, the balanced hull of any open neighborhood of the origin is again open. If $X$ is a Hausdorff topological vector space and if $K$ is a compact subset of $X$ then the balanced hull of $K$ is compact.

If a set is closed (respectively, convex, absorbing, a neighborhood of the origin) then the same is true of its balanced core.

For any subset $S \subseteq X$ and any scalar $c,$ $\operatorname{bal} (c \, S) = c \operatorname{bal} S = |c| \operatorname{bal} S.$

For any scalar $c \neq 0,$ $\operatorname{balcore} (c \, S) = c \operatorname{balcore} S = |c| \operatorname{balcore} S.$ This equality holds for $c = 0$ if and only if $S \subseteq \{0\}.$ Thus if $0 \in S$ or $S = \varnothing$ then
$$\operatorname{balcore} (c \, S) = c \operatorname{balcore} S = |c| \operatorname{balcore} S$$
for every scalar $c.$

== Related notions ==
A function $p : X \to [0, \infty)$ on a real or complex vector space is said to be a balanced function if it satisfies any of the following equivalent conditions:

1. $p(a x) \leq p(x)$ whenever $a$ is a scalar satisfying $|a| \leq 1$ and $x \in X.$
2. $p(a x) \leq p(b x)$ whenever $a$ and $b$ are scalars satisfying $|a| \leq |b|$ and $x \in X.$
3. $\{x \in X : p(x) \leq t\}$ is a balanced set for every non-negative real $t \geq 0.$

If $p$ is a balanced function then $p(a x) = p(|a| x)$ for every scalar $a$ and vector $x \in X;$ so in particular, $p(u x) = p(x)$ for every unit length scalar $u$ (satisfying $|u| = 1$) and every $x \in X.$ Using $u := -1$ shows that every balanced function is a symmetric function.

A real-valued function $p : X \to \R$ is a seminorm if and only if it is a balanced sublinear function.

== See also ==
- Absolutely convex set – Convex and balanced set
- Absorbing set – Set that can be "inflated" to reach any point
- Bounded set (topological vector space) – Generalization of boundedness
- Convex set – In geometry, set whose intersection with every line is a single line segment
- Star domain – Property of point sets in Euclidean spaces
- Symmetric set – Property of group subsets (mathematics)
- Topological vector space – Vector space with a notion of nearness
