= Radial set =

Topological set

In mathematics, a subset $A \subseteq X$ of a linear space $X$ is radial at a given point $a_0 \in A$ if for every $x \in X$ there exists a real $t_x > 0$ such that for every $t \in [0, t_x],$ $a_0 + t x \in A.$ Geometrically, this means $A$ is radial at $a_0$ if for every $x \in X,$ there is some (non-degenerate) line segment (depend on $x$) emanating from $a_0$ in the direction of $x$ that lies entirely in $A.$

== Relation to the algebraic interior ==
The points at which a set is radial are called internal points. The set of all points at which $A \subseteq X$ is radial is equal to the algebraic interior.

== Relation to absorbing sets ==
Every absorbing subset is radial at the origin $a_0 = 0,$ and if the vector space is real then the converse also holds. That is, a subset of a real vector space is absorbing if and only if it is radial at the origin. Some authors use the term radial as a synonym for absorbing.

== See also ==
- Absorbing set – Set that can be "inflated" to reach any point
- Algebraic interior – Generalization of topological interior
- Minkowski functional – Function made from a set
- Star domain – Property of point sets in Euclidean spaces
