= Geodesic convexity =

In mathematics — specifically, in Riemannian geometry — geodesic convexity is a natural generalization of convexity for sets and functions to Riemannian manifolds. It is common to drop the prefix "geodesic" and refer simply to "convexity" of a set or function.

== Definitions ==
Let (M, g) be a Riemannian manifold.

- A subset C of M is said to be a geodesically convex set if, given any two points in C, there is a unique minimizing geodesic contained within C that joins those two points.
- Let C be a geodesically convex subset of M. A function $f:C\to\mathbf{R}$ is said to be a (strictly) geodesically convex function if the composition

$$f \circ \gamma : [0, T] \to \mathbf{R}$$

is a (strictly) convex function in the usual sense for every unit speed geodesic arc γ : [0, T] → M contained within C.

== Properties ==
- A geodesically convex (subset of a) Riemannian manifold is also a convex metric space with respect to the geodesic distance.

== Examples ==
- A subset of n-dimensional Euclidean space E^{n} with its usual flat metric is geodesically convex if and only if it is convex in the usual sense, and similarly for functions.
- The "northern hemisphere" of the 2-dimensional sphere S^{2} with its usual metric is geodesically convex. However, the subset A of S^{2} consisting of those points with latitude further north than 45° south is not geodesically convex, since the minimizing geodesic (great circle) arc joining two distinct points on the southern boundary of A leaves A (e.g. in the case of two points 180° apart in longitude, the geodesic arc passes over the south pole).
