= Absorbing set =

Set that can be "inflated" to reach any point

In functional analysis and related areas of mathematics an absorbing set in a vector space is a set $S$ which can be "inflated" or "scaled up" to eventually always include any given point of the vector space. Alternative terms are radial or absorbent set. Every neighborhood of the origin in every topological vector space is an absorbing subset.

== Definition ==
Notation for scalars

Suppose that $X$ is a vector space over the field $\mathbb{K}$ of real numbers $\R$ or complex numbers $\Complex,$ and for any $-\infty \leq r \leq \infty,$ let
$$B_r = \{a \in \mathbb{K} : |a| < r\} \quad \text{ and } \quad B_{\leq r} = \{a \in \mathbb{K} : |a| \leq r\}$$
denote the open ball (respectively, the closed ball) of radius $r$ in $\mathbb{K}$ centered at $0.$ Define the product of a set $K \subseteq \mathbb{K}$ of scalars with a set $A$ of vectors as $K A = \{k a : k \in K, a \in A\},$ and define the product of $K \subseteq \mathbb{K}$ with a single vector $x$ as $K x = \{k x : k \in K\}.$

=== Preliminaries ===
Balanced core and balanced hull

A subset $S$ of $X$ is said to be balanced if $a s \in S$ for all $s \in S$ and all scalars $a$ satisfying $|a| \leq 1;$ this condition may be written more succinctly as $B_{\leq 1} S \subseteq S,$ and it holds if and only if $B_{\leq 1} S = S.$

Given a set $T,$ the smallest balanced set containing $T,$ denoted by $\operatorname{bal} T,$ is called the balanced hull of $T$ while the largest balanced set contained within $T,$ denoted by $\operatorname{balcore} T,$ is called the balanced core of $T.$ These sets are given by the formulas
$$\operatorname{bal} T ~=~ {\textstyle\bigcup\limits_{|c| \leq 1}} c \, T = B_{\leq 1} T$$
and
$$\operatorname{balcore} T ~=~ \begin{cases}
{\textstyle\bigcap\limits_{|c| \geq 1}} c \, T & \text{ if } 0 \in T \\
\varnothing                 & \text{ if } 0 \not\in T, \\
\end{cases}$$
(these formulas show that the balanced hull and the balanced core always exist and are unique). A set $T$ is balanced if and only if it is equal to its balanced hull ($T = \operatorname{bal} T$) or to its balanced core ($T = \operatorname{balcore} T$), in which case all three of these sets are equal: $T = \operatorname{bal} T = \operatorname{balcore} T.$

If $c$ is any scalar then
$$\operatorname{bal} (c \, T) = c \, \operatorname{bal} T = |c| \, \operatorname{bal} T$$
while if $c \neq 0$ is non-zero or if $0 \in T$ then also
$$\operatorname{balcore} (c \, T) = c \, \operatorname{balcore} T = |c| \, \operatorname{balcore} T.$$

=== One set absorbing another ===
If $S$ and $A$ are subsets of $X,$ then $A$ is said to absorb $S$ if it satisfies any of the following equivalent conditions:

1. Definition: There exists a real $r > 0$ such that $S \, \subseteq \, c \, A$ for every scalar $c$ satisfying $|c| \geq r.$ Or stated more succinctly, $S \; \subseteq \; {\textstyle\bigcap\limits_{|c| \geq r}} c \, A$ for some $r > 0.$
  - If the scalar field is $\R$ then intuitively, "$A$ absorbs $S$" means that if $A$ is perpetually "scaled up" or "inflated" (referring to $t A$ as $t \to \infty$) then eventually (for all positive $t > 0$ sufficiently large), all $t A$ will contain $S;$ and similarly, $t A$ must also eventually contain $S$ for all negative $t < 0$ sufficiently large in magnitude.
  - This definition depends on the underlying scalar field's canonical norm (that is, on the absolute value $|\cdot|$), which thus ties this definition to the usual Euclidean topology on the scalar field. Consequently, the definition of an absorbing set (given below) is also tied to this topology.
2. There exists a real $r > 0$ such that $c \, S \, \subseteq \, A$ for every non-zero (Note: The requirement that the scalar $c$ be non-zero cannot be dropped from this characterization.) scalar $c \neq 0$ satisfying $|c| \leq r.$ Or stated more succinctly, ${\textstyle\bigcup\limits_{0 < |c| \leq r}} c \, S \, \subseteq \, A$ for some $r > 0.$
  - Because this union is equal to $\left(B_{\leq r} \setminus \{0\}\right) S,$ where $B_{\leq r} \setminus \{0\} = \{c \in \mathbb{K} : 0 < |c| \leq r\}$ is the closed ball with the origin removed, this condition may be restated as: $\left(B_{\leq r} \setminus \{0\}\right) S \, \subseteq \, A$ for some $r > 0.$
  - The non-strict inequality $\,\leq\,$ can be replaced with the strict inequality $\,<\,,$ which is the next characterization.
3. There exists a real $r > 0$ such that $c \, S \, \subseteq \, A$ for every non-zero scalar $c \neq 0$ satisfying $|c| < r.$ Or stated more succinctly, $\left(B_r \setminus \{0\}\right) S \subseteq \, A$ for some $r > 0.$
  - Here $B_r \setminus \{0\} = \{c \in \mathbb{K} : 0 < |c| < r\}$ is the open ball with the origin removed and $\left(B_r \setminus \{0\}\right) S \, = \, {\textstyle\bigcup\limits_{0 < |c| < r}} c \, S.$

If $A$ is a balanced set then this list can be extended to include:

4. There exists a non-zero scalar $c \neq 0$ such that $S \; \subseteq \, c \, A.$
  - If $0 \in A$ then the requirement $c \neq 0$ may be dropped.
5. There exists a non-zero scalar $c \neq 0$ such that $c \, S \, \subseteq \, A.$

If $0 \in A$ (a necessary condition for $A$ to be an absorbing set, or to be a neighborhood of the origin in a topology) then this list can be extended to include:

6. There exists $r > 0$ such that $c \, S \; \subseteq \, A$ for every scalar $c$ satisfying $|c| < r.$ Or stated more succinctly, $B_r \; S \, \subseteq \, A.$
7. There exists $r > 0$ such that $c \, S \; \subseteq \, A$ for every scalar $c$ satisfying $|c| \leq r.$ Or stated more succinctly, $B_{\leq r} S \, \subseteq \, A.$
  - The inclusion $B_{\leq r} S \, \subseteq \, A$ is equivalent to $B_{\leq 1} S \, \subseteq \, \tfrac{1}{r} A$ (since $B_{\leq r} = r \, B_{\leq 1}$). Because $B_{\leq 1} S \, = \, \operatorname{bal} \, S,$ this may be rewritten $\operatorname{bal} \, S \, \subseteq \, \tfrac{1}{r} A,$ which gives the next statement.
8. There exists $r > 0$ such that $\operatorname{bal} \, S \, \subseteq \, r \, A.$
9. There exists $r > 0$ such that $\operatorname{bal} \, S \, \subseteq \, \operatorname{balcore} (r \, A).$
10. There exists $r > 0$ such that $\;\;\;\;\;\; S \, \subseteq \, \operatorname{balcore} (r \, A).$
  - The next characterizations follow from those above and the fact that for every scalar $c,$ the balanced hull of $A$ satisfies $\,\operatorname{bal} (c \, A) = c \, \operatorname{bal} A = |c| \, \operatorname{bal} A\,$ and (since $0 \in A$) its balanced core satisfies $\,\operatorname{balcore} (c \, A) = c \, \operatorname{balcore} A = |c| \, \operatorname{balcore} A.$
11. There exists $r > 0$ such that $\;\;\, S \, \subseteq \, r \, \operatorname{balcore} A.$ In words, a set is absorbed by $A$ if it is contained in some positive scalar multiple of the balanced core of $A.$
12. There exists $r > 0$ such that $r \, S \subseteq \,\;\;\;\; \operatorname{balcore} A.$
13. There exists a non-zero scalar $c \neq 0$ such that $c \, S \, \subseteq \, \operatorname{balcore} A.$ In words, the balanced core of $A$ contains some non-zero scalar multiple of $S.$
14. There exists a scalar $c$ such that $\operatorname{bal} S \, \subseteq \, c \, A.$ In words, $A$ can be scaled to contain the balanced hull of $S.$
15. There exists a scalar $c$ such that $\operatorname{bal} S \, \subseteq \, \operatorname{balcore} (c \, A).$
16. There exists a scalar $c$ such that $\;\;\;\;\;\; S \, \subseteq \, \operatorname{balcore} (c \, A).$ In words, $A$ can be scaled so that its balanced core contains $S.$
17. There exists a scalar $c$ such that $\;\;\;\;\;\; S \, \subseteq \, c \, \operatorname{balcore} A.$
18. There exists a scalar $c$ such that $\operatorname{bal} S \, \subseteq \, c \, \operatorname{balcore} (A).$ In words, the balanced core of $A$ can be scaled to contain the balanced hull of $S.$
19. The balanced core of $A$ absorbs the balanced hull $S$ (according to any defining condition of "absorbs" other than this one).

If $0 \not\in S$ or $0 \in A$ then this list can be extended to include:

20. $A \cup \{0\}$ absorbs $S$ (according to any defining condition of "absorbs" other than this one).
  - In other words, $A$ may be replaced by $A \cup \{0\}$ in the characterizations above if $0 \not\in S$ (or trivially, if $0 \in A$).

A set absorbing a point

A set is said to absorb a point $x$ if it absorbs the singleton set $\{x\}.$ A set $A$ absorbs the origin if and only if it contains the origin; that is, if and only if $0 \in A.$ As detailed below, a set is said to be absorbing in $X$ if it absorbs every point of $X.$

This notion of one set absorbing another is also used in other definitions: A subset of a topological vector space $X$ is called bounded if it is absorbed by every neighborhood of the origin. A set is called bornivorous if it absorbs every bounded subset.

First examples

Every set absorbs the empty set but the empty set does not absorb any non-empty set. The singleton set $\{\mathbf{0}\}$ containing the origin is the one and only singleton subset that absorbs itself.

Suppose that $X$ is equal to either $\R^2$ or $\Complex.$ If $A := S^1 \cup \{\mathbf{0}\}$ is the unit circle (centered at the origin $\mathbf{0}$) together with the origin, then $\{\mathbf{0}\}$ is the one and only non-empty set that $A$ absorbs. Moreover, there does not exist any non-empty subset of $X$ that is absorbed by the unit circle $S^1.$ In contrast, every neighborhood of the origin absorbs every bounded subset of $X$ (and so in particular, absorbs every singleton subset/point).

=== Absorbing set ===
A subset $A$ of a vector space $X$ over a field $\mathbb{K}$ is called an absorbing (or absorbent) subset of $X$ and is said to be absorbing in $X$ if it satisfies any of the following equivalent conditions (here ordered so that each condition is an easy consequence of the previous one, starting with the definition):

1. Definition: $A$ absorbs every point of $X;$ that is, for every $x \in X,$ $A$ absorbs $\{x\}.$
  - So in particular, $A$ can not be absorbing if $0 \not\in A.$ Every absorbing set must contain the origin.
2. $A$ absorbs every finite subset of $X.$
3. For every $x \in X,$ there exists a real $r > 0$ such that $x \in c A$ for any scalar $c \in \mathbb{K}$ satisfying $|c| \geq r.$
4. For every $x \in X,$ there exists a real $r > 0$ such that $c x \in A$ for any scalar $c \in \mathbb{K}$ satisfying $|c| \leq r.$
5. For every $x \in X,$ there exists a real $r > 0$ such that $B_r x \subseteq A.$
  - Here $B_r = \{c \in \mathbb{K} : |c| < r\}$ is the open ball of radius $r$ in the scalar field centered at the origin and $B_r x = \left\{c x : c \in B_r\right\} = \{c x : c \in \mathbb{K} \text{ and } |c| < r\}.$
  - The closed ball can be used in place of the open ball.
  - Because $B_r x \subseteq \mathbb{K} x = \operatorname{span} \{x\},$ the inclusion $B_r x \subseteq A$ holds if and only if $B_r x \subseteq A \cap \mathbb{K} x.$ This proves the next statement.
6. For every $x \in X,$ there exists a real $r > 0$ such that $B_r x \subseteq A \cap \mathbb{K} x,$ where $\mathbb{K} x = \operatorname{span} \{x\}.$
  - Connection to topology: If $\mathbb{K} x$ is given its usual Hausdorff Euclidean topology then the set $B_r x$ is a neighborhood of the origin in $\mathbb{K} x;$ thus, there exists a real $r > 0$ such that $B_r x \subseteq A \cap \mathbb{K} x$ if and only if $A \cap \mathbb{K} x$ is a neighborhood of the origin in $\mathbb{K} x.$ Consequently, $A$ satisfies this condition if and only if for every $x \in X,$ $A \cap \operatorname{span} \{x\}$ is a neighborhood of $0$ in $\operatorname{span} \{x\} = \mathbb{K} x$ when $\operatorname{span} \{x\}$ is given the Euclidean topology. This gives the next characterization.
  - The only TVS topologies (Note: A topology on a vector space $X$ is called a vector topology or a TVS-topology if its makes vector addition $X \times X \to X$ and scalar multiplication $\mathbb{K} \times X \to X$ continuous when the scalar field $\mathbb{K}$ is given its usual norm-induced Euclidean topology (that norm being the absolute value $|\cdot|$). Since restrictions of continuous functions are continuous, if $Y$ is a vector subspace of a TVS $X$ then $Y$'s vector addition $Y \times Y \to Y$ and scalar multiplication $\mathbb{K} \times Y \to Y$ operations will also be continuous. Thus the subspace topology that any vector subspace inherits from a TVS will once again be a vector topology.) on a 1-dimensional vector space are the (non-Hausdorff) trivial topology and the Hausdorff Euclidean topology. Every 1-dimensional vector subspace of $X$ is of the form $\mathbb{K} x = \operatorname{span} \{x\}$ for some non-zero $x \in X$ and if this 1-dimensional space $\mathbb{K} x$ is endowed with the (unique) Hausdorff vector topology, then the map $\mathbb{K} \to \mathbb{K} x$ defined by $c \mapsto c x$ is necessarily a TVS-isomorphism (where as usual, $\mathbb{K}$ is endowed with its standard Euclidean topology induced by the Euclidean metric).
7. $A$ contains the origin and for every 1-dimensional vector subspace $Y$ of $X,$ $A \cap Y$ is a neighborhood of the origin in $Y$ when $Y$ is given its unique Hausdorff vector topology (i.e. the Euclidean topology).
  - The reason why the Euclidean topology is distinguished in this characterization ultimately stems from the defining requirement on TVS topologies that scalar multiplication $\mathbb{K} \times X \to X$ be continuous when the scalar field $\mathbb{K}$ is given this (Euclidean) topology.
  - $0$-Neighborhoods are absorbing: This condition gives insight as to why every neighborhood of the origin in every topological vector space (TVS) is necessarily absorbing: If $U$ is a neighborhood of the origin in a TVS $X$ then for every 1-dimensional vector subspace $Y,$ $U \cap Y$ is a neighborhood of the origin in $Y$ when $Y$ is endowed with the subspace topology induced on it by $X.$ This subspace topology is always a vector topology and because $Y$ is 1-dimensional, the only vector topologies on it are the Hausdorff Euclidean topology and the trivial topology, which is a subset of the Euclidean topology. So regardless of which of these vector topologies is on $Y,$ the set $U \cap Y$ will be a neighborhood of the origin in $Y$ with respect to its unique Hausdorff vector topology (the Euclidean topology). (Note: If $U$ is a neighborhood of the origin in a TVS $X$ then it would be pathological if there existed any 1-dimensional vector subspace $Y$ in which $U \cap Y$ was not a neighborhood of the origin in at least some TVS topology on $Y.$ The only TVS topologies on $Y$ are the Hausdorff Euclidean topology and the trivial topology, which is a subset of the Euclidean topology. Consequently, this pathology does not occur if and only if $U \cap Y$ to be a neighborhood of $0$ in the Euclidean topology for all 1-dimensional vector subspaces $Y,$ which is exactly the condition that $U$ be absorbing in $X.$ The fact that all neighborhoods of the origin in all TVSs are necessarily absorbing means that this pathological behavior does not occur.) Thus $U$ is absorbing.
8. $A$ contains the origin and for every 1-dimensional vector subspace $Y$ of $X,$ $A \cap Y$ is absorbing in $Y$ (according to any defining condition of "absorbing" other than this one).
  - This characterization shows that the property of being absorbing in $X$ depends only on how $A$ behaves with respect to 1 (or 0) dimensional vector subspaces of $X.$ In contrast, if a finite-dimensional vector subspace $Z$ of $X$ has dimension $n > 1$ and is endowed with its unique Hausdorff TVS topology, then $A \cap Z$ being absorbing in $Z$ is no longer sufficient to guarantee that $A \cap Z$ is a neighborhood of the origin in $Z$ (although it will still be a necessary condition). For this to happen, it suffices for $A \cap Z$ to be an absorbing set that is also convex, balanced, and closed in $Z$ (such a set is called a barrel and it will be a neighborhood of the origin in $Z$ because every finite-dimensional Euclidean space, including $Z,$ is a barrelled space).

If $\mathbb{K} = \Reals$ then to this list can be appended:

9. The algebraic interior of $A$ contains the origin (that is, $0 \in {}^{i}A$).

If $A$ is balanced then to this list can be appended:

10. For every $x \in X,$ there exists a scalar $c \neq 0$ such that $x \in c A$ (or equivalently, such that $c x \in A$).
11. For every $x \in X,$ there exists a scalar $c$ such that $x \in c A.$

If $A$ is convex or balanced then to this list can be appended:

12. For every $x \in X,$ there exists a positive real $r > 0$ such that $r x \in A.$
  - The proof that a balanced set $A$ satisfying this condition is necessarily absorbing in $X$ follows immediately from condition (10) above and the fact that $c A = |c| A$ for all scalars $c \neq 0$ (where $r := |c| > 0$ is real).
  - The proof that a convex set $A$ satisfying this condition is necessarily absorbing in $X$ is less trivial (but not difficult). A detailed proof is given in this footnote (Note: Proof: Let $X$ be a vector space over the field $\mathbb{K},$ with $\mathbb{K}$ being $\R$ or $\Complex,$ and endow the field $\mathbb{K}$ with its usual normed Euclidean topology. Let $A$ be a convex set such that for every $z \in X,$ there exists a positive real $r > 0$ such that $r z \in A.$ Because $0 \in A,$ if $X = \{0\}$ then the proof is complete so assume $\operatorname{dim} X \neq 0.$ Clearly, every non-empty convex subset of the real line $\R$ is an interval (possibly open, closed, or half-closed; possibly degenerate (that is, a singleton set); possibly bounded or unbounded). Recall that the intersection of convex sets is convex so that for every $0 \neq y \in X,$ the sets $A \cap \mathbb{K} y$ and $A \cap \R y$ are convex, where now the convexity of $A \cap \R y$ (which contains the origin and is contained in the line $\R y$) implies that $A \cap \R y$ is an interval contained in the line $\R y = \{r y : -\infty < r < \infty\}.$ Lemma: If $0 \neq y \in X$ then the interval $A \cap \R y$ contains an open sub-interval that contains the origin. Proof of lemma: By assumption, since $y \in X$ we can pick some $R > 0$ such that $R y \in A$ and (because $- y \in X$) we can also pick some $r > 0$ such that $r (- y) \in A,$ where $r (-y) = (- r) y$ and $- r y \neq R y$ (since $y \neq 0$). Because $A \cap \R y$ is convex and contains the distinct points $- r y$ and $R y,$ it contains the convex hull of the points $\{- r y, R y\},$ which (in particular) contains the open sub-interval $(-r, R) y = \{t y : -r < t < R, t \in \R\},$ where this open sub-interval $(-r, R) y$ contains the origin (to see why, take $t = 0,$ which satisfies $- r < t = 0 < R$), which proves the lemma. $\blacksquare$ Now fix $0 \neq x \in X,$ let $Y := \operatorname{span} \{x\} = \mathbb{K} x.$ Because $0 \neq x \in X$ was arbitrary, to prove that $A$ is absorbing in $X$ it is necessary and sufficient to show that $A \cap Y$ is a neighborhood of the origin in $Y$ when $Y$ is given its usual Hausdorff Euclidean topology, where recall that this topology makes the map $\mathbb{K} \to \mathbb{K} x$ defined by $c \mapsto c x$ into a TVS-isomorphism. If $\mathbb{K} = \R$ then the fact that the interval $A \cap Y = A \cap \R x$ contains an open sub-interval around the origin means exactly that $A \cap Y$ is a neighborhood of the origin in $Y = \R x,$ which completes the proof. So assume that $\mathbb{K} = \Complex.$ Write $i := \sqrt{-1},$ so that $i x \in Y = \Complex x,$ and $Y = \Complex x = (\R x) + (\R (i x))$ (naively, $\R x$ is the "$x$-axis" and $\R (i x)$ is the "$y$-axis" of $\Complex (i x)$). The set $S := (A \cap \R x) \cup (A \cap \R (i x))$ is contained in the convex set $A \cap Y,$ so that the convex hull of $S$ is contained in $A \cap Y.$ By the lemma, each of $A \cap \R x$ and $A \cap \R (i x)$ are line segments (intervals) with each segment containing the origin in an open sub-interval; moreover, they clearly intersect at the origin. Pick a real $d > 0$ such that $(-d, d) x = \{t x : -d < t < d, t \in \R\} \subseteq A \cap \R x$ and $(-d, d) i x = \{t i x : -d < t < d, t \in \R\} \subseteq A \cap \R (i x).$ Let $N$ denote the convex hull of $[(-d, d) x] \cup [(-d, d) i x],$ which is contained in the convex hull of $S$ and thus also contained in the convex set $A \cap Y.$ To finish the proof, it suffices to show that $N$ is a neighborhood of $0$ in $Y.$ Viewed as a subset of the complex plane $\Complex \cong Y,$ $N$ is shaped like an open square with its four corners on the positive and negative $x$ and $y$-axes (that is, in $(0, \infty) x,$ $(-\infty, 0) x,$ $(0, \infty) i x,$ and $(-\infty, 0) i x$). So it is readily verified that $N$ contains the open ball $B_{d/2} x := \{c x : c \in \mathbb{K} \text{ and } |c| < d/2\}$ of radius $d/2$ centered at the origin of $Y = \Complex x.$ Thus $A \cap Y$ is a neighborhood of the origin in $Y = \Complex x,$ as desired. $\blacksquare$) and a summary is given below.
    - Summary of proof: By assumption, for any non-zero $0 \neq y \in X,$ it is possible to pick positive real $r > 0$ and $R > 0$ such that $R y \in A$ and $r (- y) \in A$ so that the convex set $A \cap \Reals y$ contains the open sub-interval $(-r, R) y \,\stackrel{\scriptscriptstyle\text{def}}{=}\, \{t y : -r < t < R, t \in \Reals\},$ which contains the origin ($A \cap \Reals y$ is called an interval since we identify $\Reals y$ with $\Reals$ and every non-empty convex subset of $\Reals$ is an interval). Give $\mathbb{K} y$ its unique Hausdorff vector topology so it remains to show that $A \cap \mathbb{K} y$ is a neighborhood of the origin in $\mathbb{K} y.$ If $\mathbb{K} = \Reals$ then we are done, so assume that $\mathbb{K} = \Complex.$ The set $S \,\stackrel{\scriptscriptstyle\text{def}}{=}\, (A \cap \Reals y) \,\cup\, (A \cap \Reals (i y)) \,\subseteq\, A \cap (\Complex y)$ is a union of two intervals, each of which contains an open sub-interval that contains the origin; moreover, the intersection of these two intervals is precisely the origin. So the quadrilateral-shaped convex hull of $S,$ which is contained in the convex set $A \cap \Complex y,$ clearly contains an open ball around the origin. $\blacksquare$
13. For every $x \in X,$ there exists a positive real $r > 0$ such that $x \in r A.$
  - This condition is equivalent to: every $x \in X$ belongs to the set ${\textstyle\bigcup\limits_{0 < r < \infty}} r A = \{r a : 0 < r < \infty, a \in A\} = (0, \infty) A.$ This happens if and only if $X = (0, \infty) A,$ which gives the next characterization.
14. $(0, \infty) A = X.$
  - It can be shown that for any subset $T$ of $X,$ $(0, \infty) T = X$ if and only if $T \cap (0, \infty) x \neq \varnothing$ for every $x \in X,$ where $(0, \infty) x \,\stackrel{\scriptscriptstyle\text{def}}{=}\, \{r x : 0 < r < \infty\}.$
15. For every $x \in X,$ $A \cap (0, \infty) x \neq \varnothing.$

If $0 \in A$ (which is necessary for $A$ to be absorbing) then it suffices to check any of the above conditions for all non-zero $x \in X,$ rather than all $x \in X.$

== Examples and sufficient conditions ==
=== For one set to absorb another ===
Let $F : X \to Y$ be a linear map between vector spaces and let $B \subseteq X$ and $C \subseteq Y$ be balanced sets. Then $C$ absorbs $F(B)$ if and only if $F^{-1}(C)$ absorbs $B.$

If a set $A$ absorbs another set $B$ then any superset of $A$ also absorbs $B.$ A set $A$ absorbs the origin if and only if the origin is an element of $A.$

A set $A$ absorbs a finite union $B_1 \cup \cdots \cup B_n$ of sets if and only it absorbs each set individuality (that is, if and only if $A$ absorbs $B_i$ for every $i = 1, \ldots, n$). In particular, a set $A$ is an absorbing subset of $X$ if and only if it absorbs every finite subset of $X.$

=== For a set to be absorbing ===
The unit ball of any normed vector space (or seminormed vector space) is absorbing. More generally, if $X$ is a topological vector space (TVS) then any neighborhood of the origin in $X$ is absorbing in $X.$ This fact is one of the primary motivations for defining the property "absorbing in $X.$"

Every superset of an absorbing set is absorbing. Consequently, the union of any family of (one or more) absorbing sets is absorbing. The intersection of finitely many absorbing subsets is once again an absorbing subset. However, the open balls $(-r_n, -r_n)$ of radius $r_n = 1, 1/2, 1/3, \ldots$ are all absorbing in $X := \Reals$ although their intersection $\bigcap_{n \in \N} (-1/n, 1/n) = \{0\}$ is not absorbing.

If $D \neq \varnothing$ is a disk (a convex and balanced subset) then $\operatorname{span} D = {\textstyle\bigcup\limits_{n=1}^\infty} n D;$ and so in particular, a disk $D \neq \varnothing$ is always an absorbing subset of $\operatorname{span} D.$ Thus if $D$ is a disk in $X,$ then $D$ is absorbing in $X$ if and only if $\operatorname{span} D = X.$ This conclusion is not guaranteed if the set $D \neq \varnothing$ is balanced but not convex; for example, the union $D$ of the $x$ and $y$ axes in $X = \Reals^2$ is a non-convex balanced set that is not absorbing in $\operatorname{span} D = \Reals^2.$

The image of an absorbing set under a surjective linear operator is again absorbing. The inverse image of an absorbing subset (of the codomain) under a linear operator is again absorbing (in the domain). If $A$ absorbing then the same is true of the symmetric set ${\textstyle\bigcap\limits_{|u|=1}} u A \subseteq A.$

Auxiliary normed spaces

If $W$ is convex and absorbing in $X$ then the symmetric set $D := {\textstyle\bigcap\limits_{|u|=1}} u W$ will be convex and balanced (also known as an absolutely convex set or a disk) in addition to being absorbing in $X.$ This guarantees that the Minkowski functional $p_D : X \to \Reals$ of $D$ will be a seminorm on $X,$ thereby making $\left(X, p_D\right)$ into a seminormed space that carries its canonical pseduometrizable topology. The set of scalar multiples $r D$ as $r$ ranges over $\left\{\tfrac{1}{2}, \tfrac{1}{3}, \tfrac{1}{4}, \ldots\right\}$ (or over any other set of non-zero scalars having $0$ as a limit point) forms a neighborhood basis of absorbing disks at the origin for this locally convex topology. If $X$ is a topological vector space and if this convex absorbing subset $W$ is also a bounded subset of $X,$ then all this will also be true of the absorbing disk $D := {\textstyle\bigcap\limits_{|u|=1}} u W;$ if in addition $D$ does not contain any non-trivial vector subspace then $p_D$ will be a norm and $\left(X, p_D\right)$ will form what is known as an auxiliary normed space. If this normed space is a Banach space then $D$ is called a Banach disk.

== Properties ==
Every absorbing set contains the origin. If $D$ is an absorbing disk in a vector space $X$ then there exists an absorbing disk $E$ in $X$ such that $E + E \subseteq D.$

If $A$ is an absorbing subset of $X$ then $X = {\textstyle\bigcup\limits_{n=1}^\infty} n A$ and more generally, $X = {\textstyle\bigcup\limits_{n=1}^\infty} s_n A$ for any sequence of scalars $s_1, s_2, \ldots$ such that $\left|s_n\right| \to \infty.$ Consequently, if a topological vector space $X$ is a non-meager subset of itself (or equivalently for TVSs, if it is a Baire space) and if $A$ is a closed absorbing subset of $X$ then $A$ necessarily contains a non-empty open subset of $X$ (in other words, $A$'s topological interior will not be empty), which guarantees that $A - A$ is a neighborhood of the origin in $X.$

Every absorbing set is a total set, meaning that every absorbing subspace is dense.

== See also ==
- Algebraic interior – Generalization of topological interior
- Absolutely convex set – Convex and balanced set
- Balanced set – Construct in functional analysis
- Bornivorous set – Set that can absorb any bounded subset
- Bounded set (topological vector space) – Generalization of boundedness
- Convex set – In geometry, set whose intersection with every line is a single line segment
- Locally convex topological vector space – Space with topology generated by convex sets
- Radial set – Topological set
- Star domain – Property of point sets in Euclidean spaces
- Symmetric set – Property of group subsets (mathematics)
- Topological vector space – Vector space with a notion of nearness

== Notes ==
Proofs
