= Kolmogorov's normability criterion =

Characterization of normable spaces

In mathematics, Kolmogorov's normability criterion is a theorem that provides a necessary and sufficient condition for a topological vector space to be normable; that is, for the existence of a norm on the space that generates the given topology. The normability criterion can be seen as a result in same vein as the Nagata–Smirnov metrization theorem and Bing metrization theorem, which gives a necessary and sufficient condition for a topological space to be metrizable. The result was proved by the Russian mathematician Andrey Nikolayevich Kolmogorov in 1934.

== Statement of the theorem ==
Kolmogorov's normability criterion—A topological vector space is normable if and only if it is a T_{1} space and admits a bounded convex neighbourhood of the origin.

Because translation (that is, vector addition) by a constant preserves the convexity, boundedness, and openness of sets, the words "of the origin" can be replaced with "of some point" or even with "of every point".

=== Definitions ===
It may be helpful to first recall the following terms:

- A topological vector space (TVS) is a vector space $X$ equipped with a topology $\tau$ such that the vector space operations of scalar multiplication and vector addition are continuous.
- A topological vector space $(X, \tau)$ is called normable if there is a norm $\|\cdot\|: X \to \R$ on $X$ such that the open balls of the norm $\|\cdot\|$ generate the given topology $\tau.$ (Note well that a given normable topological vector space might admit multiple such norms.)
- A topological space $X$ is called a T_{1} space if, for every two distinct points $x, y \in X,$ there is an open neighbourhood $U_x$ of $x$ that does not contain $y.$ In a topological vector space, this is equivalent to requiring that, for every $x \neq 0,$ there is an open neighbourhood of the origin not containing $x.$ Note that being T_{1} is weaker than being a Hausdorff space, in which every two distinct points $x, y \in X$ admit open neighbourhoods $U_x$ of $x$ and $U_y$ of $y$ with $U_x \cap U_y = \varnothing$; since normed and normable spaces are always Hausdorff, it is a "surprise" that the theorem only requires T_{1}.
- A subset $A$ of a vector space $X$ is a convex set if, for any two points $x, y \in A,$ the line segment joining them lies wholly within $A,$ that is, for all $0 \leq t \leq 1,$ $(1 - t) x + t y \in A.$
- A subset $A$ of a topological vector space $(X, \tau)$ is a bounded set if, for every open neighbourhood $U$ of the origin, there exists a scalar $\lambda$ so that $A \subseteq \lambda U.$ (One can think of $U$ as being "small" and $\lambda$ as being "big enough" to inflate $U$ to cover $A.$)

== See also ==
- Locally convex topological vector space – Vector space with a topology defined by convex open sets
- Normed vector space – Vector space on which a distance is defined
- Topological vector space – Vector space with a notion of nearness
