= Absolutely convex set =

Convex and balanced set

In mathematics, a subset C of a real or complex vector space is said to be absolutely convex or disked if it is convex and balanced (some people use the term "circled" instead of "balanced"), in which case it is called a disk. The disked hull or the absolute convex hull of a set is the intersection of all disks containing that set.

== Definition ==
The light gray area is the absolutely convex hull of the cross.

A subset $S$ of a real or complex vector space $X$ is called a disk and is said to be disked, absolutely convex, and convex balanced if any of the following equivalent conditions is satisfied:

1. $S$ is a convex and balanced set.
2. for any scalars $a$ and $b,$ if $|a| + |b| \leq 1$ then $a S + b S \subseteq S.$
3. for all scalars $a, b,$ and $c,$ if $|a| + |b| \leq |c|,$ then $a S + b S \subseteq c S.$
4. for any scalars $a_1, \ldots, a_n$ and $c,$ if $|a_1| + \cdots + |a_n| \leq |c|$ then $a_1 S + \cdots + a_n S \subseteq c S.$
5. for any scalars $a_1, \ldots, a_n,$ if $|a_1| + \cdots + |a_n| \leq 1$ then $a_1 S + \cdots + a_n S \subseteq S.$

The smallest convex (respectively, balanced) subset of $X$ containing a given set is called the convex hull (respectively, the balanced hull) of that set and is denoted by $\operatorname{co} S$ (respectively, $\operatorname{bal} S$).

Similarly, the disked hull, the absolute convex hull, and the convex balanced hull of a set $S$ is defined to be the smallest disk (with respect to subset inclusion) containing $S.$ The disked hull of $S$ will be denoted by $\operatorname{disk} S$ or $\operatorname{cobal} S$ and it is equal to each of the following sets:

1. $\operatorname{co} (\operatorname{bal} S),$ which is the convex hull of the balanced hull of $S$; thus, $\operatorname{cobal} S = \operatorname{co} (\operatorname{bal} S).$
  - In general, $\operatorname{cobal} S \neq \operatorname{bal} (\operatorname{co} S)$ is possible, even in finite dimensional vector spaces.
2. the intersection of all disks containing $S.$
3. $\left\{a_1 s_1 + \cdots a_n s_n ~:~ n \in \N, \, s_1, \ldots, s_n \in S, \, \text{ and } a_1, \ldots, a_n \text{ are scalars satisfying } |a_1| + \cdots + |a_n| \leq 1\right\}.$

== Sufficient conditions ==
The intersection of arbitrarily many absolutely convex sets is again absolutely convex; however, unions of absolutely convex sets need not be absolutely convex anymore.

If $D$ is a disk in $X,$ then $D$ is absorbing in $X$ if and only if $\operatorname{span} D = X.$

== Properties ==
If $S$ is an absorbing disk in a vector space $X$ then there exists an absorbing disk $E$ in $X$ such that $E + E \subseteq S.$ If $D$ is a disk and $r$ and $s$ are scalars then $s D = |s| D$ and $(r D) \cap (s D) = (\min_{} \{|r|, |s|\}) D.$

The absolutely convex hull of a bounded set in a locally convex topological vector space is again bounded.

If $D$ is a bounded disk in a TVS $X$ and if $x_{\bull} = \left(x_i\right)_{i=1}^{\infty}$ is a sequence in $D,$ then the partial sums $s_{\bull} = \left(s_n\right)_{n=1}^{\infty}$ are Cauchy, where for all $n,$ $s_n := \sum_{i=1}^n 2^{-i} x_i.$ In particular, if in addition $D$ is a sequentially complete subset of $X,$ then this series $s_{\bull}$ converges in $X$ to some point of $D.$

The convex balanced hull of $S$ contains both the convex hull of $S$ and the balanced hull of $S.$ Furthermore, it contains the balanced hull of the convex hull of $S;$ thus $\operatorname{bal} (\operatorname{co} S) ~\subseteq~ \operatorname{cobal} S ~=~ \operatorname{co} (\operatorname{bal} S),$ where the example below shows that this inclusion might be strict. However, for any subsets $S, T \subseteq X,$ if $S \subseteq T$ then $\operatorname{cobal} S \subseteq \operatorname{cobal} T$ which implies $\operatorname{cobal} (\operatorname{co} S) = \operatorname{cobal} S = \operatorname{cobal} (\operatorname{bal} S).$

=== Examples ===
Although $\operatorname{cobal} S = \operatorname{co} (\operatorname{bal} S),$ the convex balanced hull of $S$ is not necessarily equal to the balanced hull of the convex hull of $S.$ For an example where $\operatorname{cobal} S \neq \operatorname{bal} (\operatorname{co} S)$ let $X$ be the real vector space $\R^2$ and let $S := \{(-1, 1), (1, 1)\}.$ Then $\operatorname{bal} (\operatorname{co} S)$ is a strict subset of $\operatorname{cobal} S$ that is not even convex; in particular, this example also shows that the balanced hull of a convex set is not necessarily convex. The set $\operatorname{cobal} S$ is equal to the closed and filled square in $X$ with vertices $(-1, 1), (1, 1), (-1, -1),$ and $(1, -1)$ (this is because the balanced set $\operatorname{cobal} S$ must contain both $S$ and $-S = \{(-1, -1), (1, -1)\},$ where since $\operatorname{cobal} S$ is also convex, it must consequently contain the solid square $\operatorname{co} ((-S) \cup S),$ which for this particular example happens to also be balanced so that $\operatorname{cobal} S = \operatorname{co} ((-S) \cup S)$). However, $\operatorname{co} (S)$ is equal to the horizontal closed line segment between the two points in $S$ so that $\operatorname{bal} (\operatorname{co} S)$ is instead a closed "hour glass shaped" subset that intersects the $x$-axis at exactly the origin and is the union of two closed and filled isosceles triangles: one whose vertices are the origin together with $S$ and the other triangle whose vertices are the origin together with $- S = \{(-1, -1), (1, -1)\}.$ This non-convex filled "hour-glass" $\operatorname{bal} (\operatorname{co} S)$ is a proper subset of the filled square $\operatorname{cobal} S = \operatorname{co} (\operatorname{bal} S).$

== Generalizations ==
Given a fixed real number $0 < p \leq 1,$ a $p$-convex set is any subset $C$ of a vector space $X$ with the property that $r c + s d \in C$ whenever $c, d \in C$ and $r, s \geq 0$ are non-negative scalars satisfying $r^p + s^p = 1.$ It is called an absolutely $p$-convex set or a $p$-disk if $r c + s d \in C$ whenever $c, d \in C$ and $r, s$ are scalars satisfying $|r|^p + |s|^p \leq 1.$

A $p$-seminorm is any non-negative function $q : X \to \R$ that satisfies the following conditions:

1. Subadditivity/Triangle inequality: $q(x + y) \leq q(x) + q(y)$ for all $x, y \in X.$
2. Absolute homogeneity of degree $p$: $q(s x) =|s|^p q(x)$ for all $x \in X$ and all scalars $s.$

This generalizes the definition of seminorms since a map is a seminorm if and only if it is a $1$-seminorm (using $p := 1$). There exist $p$-seminorms that are not seminorms. For example, whenever $0 < p < 1$ then the map $q(f) = \int_{\R} |f(t)|^p d t$ used to define the Lp space $L_p(\R)$ is a $p$-seminorm but not a seminorm.

Given $0 < p \leq 1,$ a topological vector space is $p$-seminormable (meaning that its topology is induced by some $p$-seminorm) if and only if it has a bounded $p$-convex neighborhood of the origin.

== See also ==
- Absorbing set – Set that can be "inflated" to reach any point
- Auxiliary normed space
- Balanced set – Construct in functional analysis
- Bounded set (topological vector space) – Generalization of boundedness
- Convex set – In geometry, set whose intersection with every line is a single line segment
- Star domain – Property of point sets in Euclidean spaces
- Symmetric set – Property of group subsets (mathematics)
- Vector (geometric) – Geometric object that has length and direction, for vectors in physics
- Vector field – Assignment of a vector to each point in a subset of Euclidean space

== Bibliography ==
- Robertson, A.P.; W.J. Robertson (1964). Topological vector spaces. Cambridge Tracts in Mathematics. Vol. 53. Cambridge University Press. pp. 4–6.
- Narici, Lawrence; Beckenstein, Edward (2011). Topological Vector Spaces. Pure and applied mathematics (Second ed.). Boca Raton, FL: CRC Press. ISBN 978-1584888666. OCLC 144216834.
- Schaefer, Helmut H.; Wolff, Manfred P. (1999). Topological Vector Spaces. GTM. Vol. 8 (Second ed.). New York, NY: Springer New York Imprint Springer. ISBN 978-1-4612-7155-0. OCLC 840278135.
- Trèves, François (2006) [1967]. Topological Vector Spaces, Distributions and Kernels. Mineola, N.Y.: Dover Publications. ISBN 978-0-486-45352-1. OCLC 853623322.
