= Bounded set (topological vector space) =

Generalization of boundedness

In functional analysis and related areas of mathematics, a set in a topological vector space is called bounded or von Neumann bounded, if every neighborhood of the zero vector can be inflated to include the set. A set that is not bounded is called unbounded.

Bounded sets are a natural way to define locally convex polar topologies on the vector spaces in a dual pair, as the polar set of a bounded set is an absolutely convex and absorbing set. The concept was first introduced by John von Neumann and Andrey Kolmogorov in 1935.

== Definition ==
Suppose $X$ is a topological vector space (TVS) over a topological field $\mathbb{K}.$

A subset $B$ of $X$ is called von Neumann bounded or just bounded in $X$ if any of the following equivalent conditions are satisfied:

1. Definition: For every neighborhood $V$ of the origin there exists a real $r > 0$ such that $B \subseteq s V$ (Note: For any set $A$ and scalar $s,$ the notation $s A$ denotes the set $s A := \{s a : a \in A\}.$) for all scalars $s$ satisfying $|s| \geq r.$
  - This was the definition introduced by John von Neumann in 1935.
2. $B$ is absorbed by every neighborhood of the origin.
3. For every neighborhood $V$ of the origin there exists a scalar $s$ such that $B \subseteq s V.$
4. For every neighborhood $V$ of the origin there exists a real $r > 0$ such that $s B \subseteq V$ for all scalars $s$ satisfying $|s| \leq r.$
5. For every neighborhood $V$ of the origin there exists a real $r > 0$ such that $t B \subseteq V$ for all real $0 < t \leq r.$
6. Any one of statements (1) through (5) above but with the word "neighborhood" replaced by any of the following: "balanced neighborhood," "open balanced neighborhood," "closed balanced neighborhood," "open neighborhood," "closed neighborhood".
  - e.g. Statement (2) may become: $B$ is bounded if and only if $B$ is absorbed by every balanced neighborhood of the origin.
  - If $X$ is locally convex then the adjective "convex" may be also be added to any of these 5 replacements.
7. For every sequence of scalars $s_1, s_2, s_3, \ldots$ that converges to $0$ and every sequence $b_1, b_2, b_3, \ldots$ in $B,$ the sequence $s_1 b_1, s_2 b_2, s_3 b_3, \ldots$ converges to $0$ in $X.$
  - This was the definition of "bounded" that Andrey Kolmogorov used in 1934, which is the same as the definition introduced by Stanisław Mazur and Władysław Orlicz in 1933 for metrizable TVS. Kolmogorov used this definition to prove that a TVS is seminormable if and only if it has a bounded convex neighborhood of the origin.
8. For every sequence $b_1, b_2, b_3, \ldots$ in $B,$ the sequence $\left(\tfrac{1}{i} b_i\right)_{i=1}^{\infty}$ converges to $0$ in $X.$
9. Every countable subset of $B$ is bounded (according to any defining condition other than this one).

If $\mathcal{B}$ is a neighborhood basis for $X$ at the origin then this list may be extended to include:

10. Any one of statements (1) through (5) above but with the neighborhoods limited to those belonging to $\mathcal{B}.$
  - e.g. Statement (3) may become: For every $V \in \mathcal{B}$ there exists a scalar $s$ such that $B \subseteq s V.$

If $X$ is a locally convex space whose topology is defined by a family $\mathcal{P}$ of continuous seminorms, then this list may be extended to include:

11. $p(B)$ is bounded for all $p \in \mathcal{P}.$
12. There exists a sequence of non-zero scalars $s_1, s_2, s_3, \ldots$ such that for every sequence $b_1, b_2, b_3, \ldots$ in $B,$ the sequence $b_1 s_1, b_2 s_2, b_3 s_3, \ldots$ is bounded in $X$ (according to any defining condition other than this one).
13. For all $p \in \mathcal{P},$ $B$ is bounded (according to any defining condition other than this one) in the semi normed space $(X, p).$
14. B is weakly bounded, i.e. every continuous linear functional is bounded on B

If $X$ is a normed space with norm $\|\cdot\|$ (or more generally, if it is a seminormed space and $\|\cdot\|$ is merely a seminorm), (Note: This means that the topology on $X$ is equal to the topology induced on it by $\|\cdot\|.$ Note that every normed space is a seminormed space and every norm is a seminorm. The definition of the topology induced by a seminorm is identical to the definition of the topology induced by a norm.) then this list may be extended to include:

14. $B$ is a norm bounded subset of $(X, \|\cdot\|).$ By definition, this means that there exists a real number $r > 0$ such that $\|b\| \leq r$ for all $b \in B.$
15. $\sup_{b \in B} \|b\| < \infty.$
  - Thus, if $L : (X, \|\cdot\|) \to (Y, \|\cdot\|)$ is a linear map between two normed (or seminormed) spaces and if $B$ is the closed (alternatively, open) unit ball in $(X, \|\cdot\|)$ centered at the origin, then $L$ is a bounded linear operator (which recall means that its operator norm $\|L\| := \sup_{b \in B} \|L(b)\| < \infty$ is finite) if and only if the image $L(B)$ of this ball under $L$ is a norm bounded subset of $(Y, \|\cdot\|).$
16. $B$ is a subset of some (open or closed) ball. (Note: If $(X, \|\cdot\|)$ is a normed space or a seminormed space, then the open and closed balls of radius $r > 0$ (where $r \neq \infty$ is a real number) centered at a point $x \in X$ are, respectively, the sets $B_{< r}(x) := \{z \in X : \|z - x\| < r\}$ and $B_{\leq r}(x) := \{z \in X : \|z - x\| \leq r\}.$ Any such set is called a (non-degenerate) ball.)
  - This ball need not be centered at the origin, but its radius must (as usual) be positive and finite.

If $B$ is a vector subspace of the TVS $X$ then this list may be extended to include:

17. $B$ is contained in the closure of $\{0\}.$
  - In other words, a vector subspace of $X$ is bounded if and only if it is a subset of (the vector space) $\operatorname{cl}_X \{0\}.$
  - Recall that $X$ is a Hausdorff space if and only if $\{0\}$ is closed in $X.$ So the only bounded vector subspace of a Hausdorff TVS is $\{0\}.$

A subset that is not bounded is called unbounded.

=== Bornology and fundamental systems of bounded sets ===
The collection of all bounded sets on a topological vector space $X$ is called the von Neumann bornology or the (canonical) bornology of $X.$

A base or fundamental system of bounded sets of $X$ is a set $\mathcal{B}$ of bounded subsets of $X$ such that every bounded subset of $X$ is a subset of some $B \in \mathcal{B}.$ The set of all bounded subsets of $X$ trivially forms a fundamental system of bounded sets of $X.$

==== Examples ====
In any locally convex TVS, the set of closed and bounded disks are a base of bounded set.

== Examples and sufficient conditions ==
Unless indicated otherwise, a topological vector space (TVS) need not be Hausdorff nor locally convex.

- Finite sets are bounded.
- Every totally bounded subset of a TVS is bounded.
- Every relatively compact set in a topological vector space is bounded. If the space is equipped with the weak topology the converse is also true.
- The set of points of a Cauchy sequence is bounded, the set of points of a Cauchy net need not be bounded.
- The closure of the origin (referring to the closure of the set $\{0\}$) is always a bounded closed vector subspace. This set $\operatorname{cl}_X \{0\}$ is the unique largest (with respect to set inclusion $\,\subseteq\,$) bounded vector subspace of $X.$ In particular, if $B \subseteq X$ is a bounded subset of $X$ then so is $B + \operatorname{cl}_X \{0\}.$

Unbounded sets

A set that is not bounded is said to be unbounded.

Any vector subspace of a TVS that is not a contained in the closure of $\{0\}$ is unbounded

There exists a Fréchet space $X$ having a bounded subset $B$ and also a dense vector subspace $M$ such that $B$ is not contained in the closure (in $X$) of any bounded subset of $M.$

=== Stability properties ===
- In any TVS, finite unions, finite Minkowski sums, scalar multiples, translations, subsets, closures, interiors, and balanced hulls of bounded sets are again bounded.
- In any locally convex TVS, the convex hull (also called the convex envelope) of a bounded set is again bounded. However, this may be false if the space is not locally convex, as the (non-locally convex) Lp space $L^p$ spaces for $0 < p < 1$ have no nontrivial open convex subsets.
- The image of a bounded set under a continuous linear map is a bounded subset of the codomain.
- A subset of an arbitrary (Cartesian) product of TVSs is bounded if and only if its image under every coordinate projections is bounded.
- If $S \subseteq X \subseteq Y$ and $X$ is a topological vector subspace of $Y,$ then $S$ is bounded in $X$ if and only if $S$ is bounded in $Y.$
  - In other words, a subset $S \subseteq X$ is bounded in $X$ if and only if it is bounded in every (or equivalently, in some) topological vector superspace of $X.$

== Properties ==
A locally convex topological vector space has a bounded neighborhood of zero if and only if its topology can be defined by a single seminorm.

The polar of a bounded set is an absolutely convex and absorbing set.

Mackey's countability condition—If $B_1, B_2, B_3, \ldots$ is a countable sequence of bounded subsets of a metrizable locally convex topological vector space $X,$ then there exists a bounded subset $B$ of $X$ and a sequence $r_1, r_2, r_3, \ldots$ of positive real numbers such that $B_i \subseteq r_i B$ for all $i \in \N$ (or equivalently, such that $\tfrac{1}{r_1} B_1 \cup \tfrac{1}{r_2} B_2 \cup \tfrac{1}{r_3} B_3 \cup \cdots \subseteq B$).

Using the definition of uniformly bounded sets given below, Mackey's countability condition can be restated as: If $B_1, B_2, B_3, \ldots$ are bounded subsets of a metrizable locally convex space then there exists a sequence $t_1, t_2, t_3, \ldots$ of positive real numbers such that $t_1 B_1, \, t_2 B_2, \, t_3 B_3, \ldots$ are uniformly bounded. In words, given any countable family of bounded sets in a metrizable locally convex space, it is possible to scale each set by its own positive real so that they become uniformly bounded.

== Generalizations ==
=== Uniformly bounded sets ===
A family of sets $\mathcal{B}$ of subsets of a topological vector space $Y$ is said to be uniformly bounded in $Y,$ if there exists some bounded subset $D$ of $Y$ such that
$$B \subseteq D \quad \text{ for every } B \in \mathcal{B},$$
which happens if and only if its union
$$\cup \mathcal{B} ~:=~ \bigcup_{B \in \mathcal{B}} B$$
is a bounded subset of $Y.$ In the case of a normed (or seminormed) space, a family $\mathcal{B}$ is uniformly bounded if and only if its union $\cup \mathcal{B}$ is norm bounded, meaning that there exists some real $M \geq 0$ such that $\|b\| \leq M$ for every $b \in \cup \mathcal{B},$ or equivalently, if and only if $\sup_{\stackrel{b \in B}{B \in \mathcal{B}}} \|b\| < \infty.$

A set $H$ of maps from $X$ to $Y$ is said to be uniformly bounded on a given set $C \subseteq X$ if the family $H(C) := \{h(C) : h \in H\}$ is uniformly bounded in $Y,$ which by definition means that there exists some bounded subset $D$ of $Y$ such that $h(C) \subseteq D \text{ for all } h \in H,$ or equivalently, if and only if $\cup H(C) := \bigcup_{h \in H} h(C)$ is a bounded subset of $Y.$ A set $H$ of linear maps between two normed (or seminormed) spaces $X$ and $Y$ is uniformly bounded on some (or equivalently, every) open ball (and/or non-degenerate closed ball) in $X$ if and only if their operator norms are uniformly bounded; that is, if and only if $\sup_{h \in H} \|h\| < \infty.$

Proposition—Let $H \subseteq L(X, Y)$ be a set of continuous linear operators between two topological vector spaces $X$ and $Y$ and let $C \subseteq X$ be any bounded subset of $X.$ Then $H$ is uniformly bounded on $C$ (that is, the family $\{h(C) : h \in H\}$ is uniformly bounded in $Y$) if any of the following conditions are satisfied:

1. $H$ is equicontinuous.
2. $C$ is a convex compact Hausdorff subspace of $X$ and for every $c \in C,$ the orbit $H(c) := \{h(c) : h \in H\}$ is a bounded subset of $Y.$

Proof of part (1)

Assume $H$ is equicontinuous and let $W$ be a neighborhood of the origin in $Y.$ Since $H$ is equicontinuous, there exists a neighborhood $U$ of the origin in $X$ such that $h(U) \subseteq W$ for every $h \in H.$ Because $C$ is bounded in $X,$ there exists some real $r > 0$ such that if $t \geq r$ then $C \subseteq t U.$ So for every $h \in H$ and every $t \geq r,$ $h(C) \subseteq h(t U) = t h(U) \subseteq t W,$ which implies that $\bigcup_{h \in H} h(C) \subseteq t W.$ Thus $\bigcup_{h \in H} h(C)$ is bounded in $Y.$ Q.E.D.

Proof of part (2)

Let $W$ be a balanced neighborhood of the origin in $Y$ and let $V$ be a closed balanced neighborhood of the origin in $Y$ such that $V + V \subseteq W.$ Define
$$E ~:=~ \bigcap_{h \in H} h^{-1}(V),$$
which is a closed subset of $X$ (since $V$ is closed while every $h : X \to Y$ is continuous) that satisfies $h(E) \subseteq V$ for every $h \in H.$ Note that for every non-zero scalar $n \neq 0,$ the set $n E$ is closed in $X$ (since scalar multiplication by $n \neq 0$ is a homeomorphism) and so every $C \cap n E$ is closed in $C.$

It will now be shown that $C \subseteq \bigcup_{n \in \N} n E,$ from which $C = \bigcup_{n \in \N} (C \cap n E)$ follows. If $c \in C$ then $H(c)$ being bounded guarantees the existence of some positive integer $n = n_c \in \N$ such that $H(c) \subseteq n_c V,$ where the linearity of every $h \in H$ now implies $\tfrac{1}{n_c} c \in h^{-1}(V);$ thus $\tfrac{1}{n_c} c \in \bigcap_{h \in H} h^{-1}(V) = E$ and hence $C \subseteq \bigcup_{n \in \N} n E,$ as desired.

Thus $C = (C \cap 1 E) \cup (C \cap 2 E) \cup (C \cap 3 E) \cup \cdots$ expresses $C$ as a countable union of closed (in $C$) sets. Since $C$ is a nonmeager subset of itself (as it is a Baire space by the Baire category theorem), this is only possible if there is some integer $n \in \N$ such that $C \cap n E$ has non-empty interior in $C.$ Let $k \in \operatorname{Int}_C (C \cap n E)$ be any point belonging to this open subset of $C.$ Let $U$ be any balanced open neighborhood of the origin in $X$ such that
$$C \cap (k + U) ~\subseteq~ \operatorname{Int}_C (C \cap n E).$$

The sets $\{k + p U : p > 1\}$ form an increasing (meaning $p \leq q$ implies $k + p U \subseteq k + q U$) cover of the compact space $C,$ so there exists some $p > 1$ such that $C \subseteq k + p U$ (and thus $\tfrac{1}{p}(C - k) \subseteq U$). It will be shown that $h(C) \subseteq p n W$ for every $h \in H,$ thus demonstrating that $\{h(C) : h \in H\}$ is uniformly bounded in $Y$ and completing the proof. So fix $h \in H$ and $c \in C.$ Let
$$z ~:=~ \tfrac{p - 1}{p} k + \tfrac{1}{p} c.$$

The convexity of $C$ guarantees $z \in C$ and moreover, $z \in k + U$ since
$$z - k = \tfrac{-1}{p} k + \tfrac{1}{p} c = \tfrac{1}{p} (c - k) \in \tfrac{1}{p}(C - k) \subseteq U.$$
Thus $z \in C \cap (k + U),$ which is a subset of $\operatorname{Int}_C (C \cap n E).$ Since $n V$ is balanced and $|1 - p| = p - 1 < p,$ we have $(1 - p) n V \subseteq p n V,$ which combined with $h(E) \subseteq V$ gives
$$p n h(E) + (1 - p) n h(E) ~\subseteq~ p n V + (1 - p) n V ~\subseteq~ p n V + p n V ~\subseteq~ p n (V + V) ~\subseteq~ p n W.$$
Finally, $c = p z + (1 - p) k$ and $k, z \in n E$ imply
$$h(c) ~=~ p h(z) + (1 - p) h(k) ~\in~ p n h(E) + (1 - p) n h(E) ~\subseteq~ p n W,$$
as desired. Q.E.D.

Since every singleton subset of $X$ is also a bounded subset, it follows that if $H \subseteq L(X, Y)$ is an equicontinuous set of continuous linear operators between two topological vector spaces $X$ and $Y$ (not necessarily Hausdorff or locally convex), then the orbit $H(x) := \{h(x) : h \in H\}$ of every $x \in X$ is a bounded subset of $Y.$

=== Bounded subsets of topological modules ===
The definition of bounded sets can be generalized to topological modules. A subset $A$ of a topological module $M$ over a topological ring $R$ is bounded if for any neighborhood $N$ of $0_M$ there exists a neighborhood $w$ of $0_R$ such that $w A \subseteq B.$

== See also ==
- Bornological space – Space where bounded operators are continuous
- Bornivorous set – Set that can absorb any bounded subset
- Bounded function – Mathematical function whose set of values is bounded
- Bounded operator – Kind of linear transformation
- Bounding point – Mathematical concept related to subsets of vector spaces
- Compact space – Type of mathematical space
- Kolmogorov's normability criterion – Characterization of normable spaces
- Local boundedness
- Totally bounded space – Generalization of compactness

== Bibliography ==
- Adasch, Norbert; Ernst, Bruno; Keim, Dieter (1978). Topological Vector Spaces: The Theory Without Convexity Conditions. Lecture Notes in Mathematics. Vol. 639. Berlin New York: Springer-Verlag. ISBN 978-3-540-08662-8. OCLC 297140003.
- Berberian, Sterling K. (1974). Lectures in Functional Analysis and Operator Theory. Graduate Texts in Mathematics. Vol. 15. New York: Springer. ISBN 978-0-387-90081-0. OCLC 878109401.
- Bourbaki, Nicolas (1987) [1981]. Topological Vector Spaces: Chapters 1–5. Éléments de mathématique. Translated by Eggleston, H.G.; Madan, S. Berlin New York: Springer-Verlag. ISBN 3-540-13627-4. OCLC 17499190.
- Conway, John (1990). A course in functional analysis. Graduate Texts in Mathematics. Vol. 96 (2nd ed.). New York: Springer-Verlag. ISBN 978-0-387-97245-9. OCLC 21195908.
- Edwards, Robert E. (1995). Functional Analysis: Theory and Applications. New York: Dover Publications. ISBN 978-0-486-68143-6. OCLC 30593138.
- Grothendieck, Alexander (1973). Topological Vector Spaces. Translated by Chaljub, Orlando. New York: Gordon and Breach Science Publishers. ISBN 978-0-677-30020-7. OCLC 886098.
- Jarchow, Hans (1981). Locally convex spaces. Stuttgart: B.G. Teubner. ISBN 978-3-519-02224-4. OCLC 8210342.
- Köthe, Gottfried (1983) [1969]. Topological Vector Spaces I. Grundlehren der mathematischen Wissenschaften. Vol. 159. Translated by Garling, D.J.H. New York: Springer Science & Business Media. ISBN 978-3-642-64988-2. MR 0248498. OCLC 840293704.
- Narici, Lawrence; Beckenstein, Edward (2011). Topological Vector Spaces. Pure and applied mathematics (Second ed.). Boca Raton, FL: CRC Press. ISBN 978-1584888666. OCLC 144216834.
- Robertson, A.P.; W.J. Robertson (1964). Topological vector spaces. Cambridge Tracts in Mathematics. Vol. 53. Cambridge University Press. pp. 44–46.
- Rudin, Walter (1991). Functional Analysis. International Series in Pure and Applied Mathematics. Vol. 8 (Second ed.). New York, NY: McGraw-Hill Science/Engineering/Math. ISBN 978-0-07-054236-5. OCLC 21163277.
- Robertson, Alex P.; Robertson, Wendy J. (1980). Topological Vector Spaces. Cambridge Tracts in Mathematics. Vol. 53. Cambridge England: Cambridge University Press. ISBN 978-0-521-29882-7. OCLC 589250.
- Schaefer, H.H. (1970). Topological Vector Spaces. GTM. Vol. 3. Springer-Verlag. pp. 25–26. ISBN 0-387-05380-8.
- Schaefer, Helmut H.; Wolff, Manfred P. (1999). Topological Vector Spaces. GTM. Vol. 8 (Second ed.). New York, NY: Springer New York Imprint Springer. ISBN 978-1-4612-7155-0. OCLC 840278135.
- Wilansky, Albert (2013). Modern Methods in Topological Vector Spaces. Mineola, New York: Dover Publications, Inc. ISBN 978-0-486-49353-4. OCLC 849801114.
