= Browder fixed-point theorem =

Mathematical theorem

The Browder fixed-point theorem is a refinement of the Banach fixed-point theorem for uniformly convex Banach spaces. It asserts that if $K$ is a nonempty convex closed bounded set in uniformly convex Banach space and $f$ is a mapping of $K$ into itself such that $\|f(x)-f(y)\|\leq\|x-y\|$ (i.e. $f$ is non-expansive), then $f$ has a fixed point.

== History ==
Following the publication in 1965 of two independent versions of the theorem by Felix Browder and by William Kirk, a new proof of Michael Edelstein showed that, in a uniformly convex Banach space, every iterative sequence $f^nx_0$ of a non-expansive map $f$ has a unique asymptotic center, which is a fixed point of $f$. (An asymptotic center of a sequence $(x_k)_{k\in\mathbb N}$, if it exists, is a limit of the Chebyshev centers $c_n$ for truncated sequences $(x_k)_{k\ge n}$.) A stronger property than asymptotic center is Delta-limit of Teck-Cheong Lim, which in the uniformly convex space coincides with the weak limit if the space has the Opial property.

== See also ==
- Fixed-point theorems
