= Pettis integral =

In mathematics, the Pettis integral or Gelfand–Pettis integral, named after Israel M. Gelfand and Billy James Pettis, extends the definition of the Lebesgue integral to vector-valued functions on a measure space, by exploiting duality. The integral was introduced by Gelfand for the case when the measure space is an interval with Lebesgue measure. The integral is also called the weak integral in contrast to the Bochner integral, which is the strong integral.

== Definition ==
Let $f : X \to V$ where $(X,\Sigma,\mu)$ is a measure space and $V$ is a topological vector space (TVS) with a continuous dual space $V'$ that separates points (that is, if $x \in V$ is nonzero then there is some $l \in V'$ such that $l(x) \neq 0$), for example, $V$ is a normed space or (more generally) is a Hausdorff locally convex TVS. Evaluation of a functional may be written as a duality pairing:
$$\langle \varphi, x \rangle = \varphi[x].$$

The map $f : X \to V$ is called weakly measurable if for all $\varphi \in V',$ the scalar-valued map $\varphi \circ f$ is a measurable map. A weakly measurable map $f : X \to V$ is said to be weakly integrable on $X$ if there exists some $e \in V$ such that for all $\varphi \in V',$ the scalar-valued map $\varphi \circ f$ is Lebesgue integrable (that is, $\varphi \circ f \in L^1\left( X, \Sigma, \mu \right)$) and
$$\varphi(e) =  \int_X \varphi(f(x)) \, \mathrm{d} \mu(x).$$

The map $f : X \to V$ is said to be Pettis integrable if $\varphi \circ f \in L^1\left( X, \Sigma, \mu \right)$ for all $\varphi \in V^{\prime}$ and also for every $A \in \Sigma$ there exists a vector $e_A \in V$ such that
$$\langle \varphi, e_A \rangle = \int_A \langle \varphi, f(x) \rangle \, \mathrm{d} \mu(x) \quad \text{ for all } \varphi \in V'.$$

In this case, $e_A$ is called the Pettis integral of $f$ on $A.$ Common notations for the Pettis integral $e_A$ include
$$\int_A f \, \mathrm{d}\mu, \qquad \int_A f(x) \, \mathrm{d}\mu(x), \quad \text{and, in case that}~ A=X ~ \text{is understood,} \quad \mu[f].$$

To understand the motivation behind the definition of "weakly integrable", consider the special case where $V$ is the underlying scalar field; that is, where $V = \R$ or $V = \Complex.$ In this case, every linear functional $\varphi$ on $V$ is of the form $\varphi(y) = s y$ for some scalar $s \in V$ (that is, $\varphi$ is just scalar multiplication by a constant), the condition
$$\varphi(e) = \int_A \varphi(f(x)) \, \mathrm{d} \mu(x) \quad\text{for all}~ \varphi \in V',$$
simplifies to
$$s e =  \int_A s f(x) \, \mathrm{d} \mu(x) \quad\text{for all scalars}~ s.$$
In particular, in this special case, $f$ is weakly integrable on $X$ if and only if $f$ is Lebesgue integrable.

== Relation to Dunford integral ==
The map $f : X \to V$ is said to be Dunford integrable if $\varphi \circ f \in L^1\left( X, \Sigma, \mu \right)$ for all $\varphi \in V^{\prime}$ and also for every $A \in \Sigma$ there exists a vector $d_A \in V'',$ called the Dunford integral of $f$ on $A,$ such that
$$\langle d_A, \varphi \rangle = \int_A \langle \varphi, f(x) \rangle \, \mathrm{d} \mu(x) \quad \text{ for all } \varphi \in V'$$
where $\langle d_A, \varphi \rangle = d_A(\varphi).$

Identify every vector $x \in V$ with the map scalar-valued functional on $V'$ defined by $\varphi \in V' \mapsto \varphi(x).$ This assignment induces a map called the canonical evaluation map and through it, $V$ is identified as a vector subspace of the double dual $V''.$ The space $V$ is a semi-reflexive space if and only if this map is surjective. The $f : X \to V$ is Pettis integrable if and only if $d_A \in V$ for every $A \in \Sigma.$

== Properties ==
An immediate consequence of the definition is that Pettis integrals are compatible with continuous linear operators: If $\Phi \colon V_1 \to V_2$ is linear and continuous and $f \colon X \to V_1$ is Pettis integrable, then $\Phi\circ f$ is Pettis integrable as well and
$$\int_X \Phi(f(x))\,d\mu(x) = \Phi \left(\int_X f(x)\,d\mu(x) \right).$$

The standard estimate
$$\left |\int_X f(x)\,d\mu(x) \right | \leq \int_X |f(x)| \, d\mu(x)$$
for real- and complex-valued functions generalises to Pettis integrals in the following sense: For all continuous seminorms $p\colon V\to\mathbb{R}$ and all Pettis integrable $f \colon X \to V$,
$$p \left (\int_X f(x)\,d\mu(x) \right ) \leq  \underline{\int_X} p(f(x)) \,d\mu(x)$$
holds. The right-hand side is the lower Lebesgue integral of a $[0,\infty]$-valued function, that is,
$$\underline{\int_X} g \,d\mu := \sup \left \{ \left. \int_X h\,d\mu \; \right  | \; h \colon X \to [0,\infty] \text{ is measurable and } 0 \leq h \leq g \right \}.$$
Taking a lower Lebesgue integral is necessary because the integrand $p\circ f$ may not be measurable. This follows from the Hahn-Banach theorem because for every vector $v\in V$ there must be a continuous functional $\varphi\in V^*$ such that $\varphi(v) = p(v)$ and for all $w \in V$, $|\varphi(w)|\leq p(w)$. Applying this to $v := \int_X f \, d\mu$ gives the result.

=== Mean value theorem ===
An important property is that the Pettis integral with respect to a finite measure is contained in the closure of the convex hull of the values scaled by the measure of the integration domain:
$$\mu(A) < \infty \text{ implies } \int_A f\,d\mu \in \mu(A) \cdot \overline{\operatorname{co}(f(A))}$$

This is a consequence of the Hahn-Banach theorem and generalizes the mean value theorem for integrals of real-valued functions: If $V = \R$, then closed convex sets are simply intervals and for $f \colon X \to [a, b]$, the following inequalities hold:
$$\mu(A) a ~\leq~ \int_A f \, d\mu ~\leq~ \mu(A)b.$$

=== Existence ===
If $V = \R^n$ is finite-dimensional then $f$ is Pettis integrable if and only if each of $f$’s coordinates is Lebesgue integrable.

If $f$ is Pettis integrable and $A\in\Sigma$ is a measurable subset of $X$, then by definition $f_{|A} \colon A\to V$ and $f \cdot 1_A \colon X \to V$ are also Pettis integrable and
$$\int_A f_{|A} \,d\mu = \int_X f \cdot 1_A \,d\mu.$$

If $X$ is a topological space, $\Sigma = \mathfrak{B}_X$ its Borel-$\sigma$-algebra, $\mu$ a Borel measure that assigns finite values to compact subsets, $V$ is quasi-complete (that is, every bounded Cauchy net converges) and if $f$ is continuous with compact support, then $f$ is Pettis integrable. More generally: If $f$ is weakly measurable and there exists a compact, convex $C\subseteq V$ and a null set $N\subseteq X$ such that $f(X \setminus N) \subseteq C$, then $f$ is Pettis-integrable.

== Law of large numbers for Pettis-integrable random variables ==
Let $(\Omega, \mathcal F, \operatorname P)$ be a probability space, and let $V$ be a topological vector space with a dual space that separates points. Let $v_n : \Omega \to V$ be a sequence of Pettis-integrable random variables, and write $\operatorname E[v_n]$ for the Pettis integral of $v_n$ (over $X$). Note that $\operatorname E[v_n]$ is a (non-random) vector in $V,$ and is not a scalar value.

Let
$$\bar v_N := \frac{1}{N} \sum_{n=1}^N v_n$$
denote the sample average. By linearity, $\bar v_N$ is Pettis integrable, and
$$\operatorname E[\bar v_N] = \frac{1}{N} \sum_{n=1}^N \operatorname E[v_n] \in V.$$

Suppose that the partial sums
$$\frac{1}{N} \sum_{n=1}^N \operatorname E[\bar v_n]$$
converge absolutely in the topology of $V,$ in the sense that all rearrangements of the sum converge to a single vector $\lambda \in V.$ The weak law of large numbers implies that $\langle \varphi, \operatorname E[\bar v_N] - \lambda \rangle \to 0$ for every functional $\varphi \in V^*.$ Consequently, $\operatorname E[\bar v_N] \to \lambda$ in the weak topology on $X.$

Without further assumptions, it is possible that $\operatorname E[\bar v_N]$ does not converge to $\lambda.$ To get strong convergence, more assumptions are necessary.

== See also ==
- Bochner measurable function
- Bochner integral – Concept in mathematics
- Bochner space – Type of topological space
- Vector measure – Generalization of finite measure to Banach spaces
- Weakly measurable function
