= Bochner integral =

Concept in mathematics

In mathematics, the Bochner integral, named for Salomon Bochner, extends the definition of a multidimensional Lebesgue integral to functions that take values in a Banach space, as the limit of integrals of simple functions.

The Bochner integral provides the mathematical foundation for extensions of basic integral transforms into more abstract spaces, vector-valued functions, and operator spaces. Examples of such extensions include vector-valued Laplace transforms and abstract Fourier transforms.

== Definition ==
Let $(X, \Sigma, \mu)$ be a measure space, and $B$ be a Banach space, and define a measurable function $f : X \to B$. When $B = \R$, we have the standard Lebesgue integral $\int_X f d\mu$, and when $B = \R^n$, we have the standard multidimensional Lebesgue integral $\int_X \vec f d\mu$. For generic Banach spaces, the Bochner integral extends the above cases.

First, define a simple function to be any finite sum of the form
$$s(x) = \sum_{i=1}^n \chi_{E_i}(x) b_i,$$
where the $E_i$ are disjoint members of the $\sigma$-algebra $\Sigma,$ the $b_i$ are distinct elements of $B,$ and χ_{E} is the characteristic function of $E.$ If $\mu\left(E_i\right)$ is finite whenever $b_i \neq 0,$ then the simple function is integrable, and the integral is then defined by
$$\int_X \left[\sum_{i=1}^n \chi_{E_i}(x) b_i\right]\, d\mu = \sum_{i=1}^n \mu(E_i) b_i$$
exactly as it is for the ordinary Lebesgue integral.

A measurable function $f : X \to B$ is Bochner integrable if there exists a sequence of integrable simple functions $s_n$ such that
$$\lim_{n\to\infty}\int_X \|f-s_n\|_B\,d\mu = 0,$$
where the integral on the left-hand side is an ordinary Lebesgue integral.

In this case, the Bochner integral is defined by
$$\int_X f\, d\mu = \lim_{n\to\infty}\int_X s_n\, d\mu.$$

It can be shown that the sequence $\left\{\int_Xs_n\,d\mu \right\}_{n=1}^{\infty}$ is a Cauchy sequence in the Banach space $B ,$ hence the limit on the right exists. $\lim_{n\to\infty}\int_X s_n\, d\mu$ is an element of $B$.

Furthermore, the limit is independent of the approximating sequence of simple functions $\{s_n\}_{n=1}^{\infty}.$ These remarks show that the integral is well-defined (i.e independent of any choices). It can be shown that a function is Bochner integrable if and only if it lies in the Bochner space $L^1.$

== Properties ==
=== Elementary properties ===
Many of the familiar properties of the Lebesgue integral continue to hold for the Bochner integral. Particularly useful is Bochner's criterion for integrability, which states that if $(X, \Sigma, \mu)$ is a measure space, then a Bochner-measurable function $f \colon X \to B$ is Bochner integrable if and only if
$$\int_X \|f\|_B\, \mathrm{d} \mu < \infty.$$

Here, a function $f \colon X \to B$ is called Bochner measurable if it is equal $\mu$-almost everywhere to a function $g$ taking values in a separable subspace $B_0$ of $B$, and such that the inverse image $g^{-1}(U)$ of every open set $U$ in $B$ belongs to $\Sigma$. Equivalently, $f$ is the limit $\mu$-almost everywhere of a sequence of countably-valued simple functions.

=== Linear operators ===
If $T \colon B \to B'$ is a continuous linear operator between Banach spaces $B$ and $B'$, and $f \colon X \to B$ is Bochner integrable, then it is relatively straightforward to show that $T f \colon X \to B'$ is Bochner integrable and integration and the application of $T$ may be interchanged:
$$\int_E T f \, \mathrm{d} \mu = T \int_E f \, \mathrm{d} \mu$$
for all measurable subsets $E \in \Sigma$.

A non-trivially stronger form of this result, known as Hille's theorem, also holds for closed operators. If $T \colon B \to B'$ is a closed linear operator between Banach spaces $B$ and $B'$ and both $f \colon X \to B$ and $T f \colon X \to B'$ are Bochner integrable, then
$$\int_E T f \, \mathrm{d} \mu = T \int_E f \, \mathrm{d} \mu$$
for all measurable subsets $E \in \Sigma$.

=== Dominated convergence theorem ===
A version of the dominated convergence theorem also holds for the Bochner integral. Specifically, if $f_n \colon X \to B$ is a sequence of measurable functions on a complete measure space tending almost everywhere to a limit function $f$, and if
$$\|f_n(x)\|_B \leq g(x)$$
for almost every $x \in X$, and $g \in L^1(\mu)$, then
$$\int_E \|f-f_n\|_B \, \mathrm{d} \mu \to 0$$
as $n \to \infty$ and
$$\int_E f_n\, \mathrm{d} \mu \to \int_E f \, \mathrm{d} \mu$$
for all $E \in \Sigma$.

If $f$ is Bochner integrable, then the inequality
$$\left\|\int_E f \, \mathrm{d} \mu\right\|_B \leq \int_E \|f\|_B \, \mathrm{d} \mu$$
holds for all $E \in \Sigma.$ In particular, the set function
$$E\mapsto \int_E f\, \mathrm{d} \mu$$
defines a countably-additive $B$-valued vector measure on $X$ which is absolutely continuous with respect to $\mu$.

== Radon–Nikodym property ==
An important fact about the Bochner integral is that the Radon–Nikodym theorem fails to hold in general, and instead is a property (the Radon–Nikodym property) defining an important class of ″nice″ Banach spaces.

Specifically, if $\mu$ is a measure on $(X, \Sigma),$ then $B$ has the Radon–Nikodym property with respect to $\mu$ if, for every countably-additive vector measure $\gamma$ on $(X, \Sigma)$ with values in $B$ which has bounded variation and is absolutely continuous with respect to $\mu,$ there is a $\mu$-integrable function $g : X \to B$ such that
$$\gamma(E) = \int_E g\, d\mu$$
for every measurable set $E \in \Sigma.$

The Banach space $B$ has the Radon–Nikodym property if $B$ has the Radon–Nikodym property with respect to every finite measure. Equivalent formulations include:

- Bounded discrete-time martingales in $B$ converge a.s.
- Functions of bounded-variation into $B$ are differentiable a.e.
- For every bounded $D\subseteq B$, there exists $f\in B^*$ and $\delta\in\mathbb{R}^+$ such that
  $$\{x:f(x)+\delta>\sup{f(D)}\}\subseteq D$$
  has arbitrarily small diameter.

It is known that the space $\ell_1$ has the Radon–Nikodym property, but $c_0$ and the spaces $L^{\infty}(\Omega),$ $L^1(\Omega),$ for $\Omega$ an open bounded subset of $\R^n,$ and $C(K),$ for $K$ an infinite compact space, do not. Spaces with Radon–Nikodym property include separable dual spaces (this is the Dunford–Pettis theorem) and reflexive spaces, which include, in particular, Hilbert spaces.

== Probability ==
The Bochner integral is used in probability theory for handling random variables and stochastic processes that take values in a Banach space. The classical convergence theorems—such as the dominated convergence theorem—when applied to the Bochner integral, generalize laws of large numbers and central limit theorems for sequences of Banach-space-valued random variables. Such integrals are central to the analysis of distributions in functional spaces and have applications in fields such as stochastic calculus, statistical field theory, and quantum field theory.

Let $(\Omega, \mathcal{F}, \mathbb{P})$ be a probability space, and consider a random variable $X \colon \Omega \to B$ taking values in a Banach space $B$. When $X$ is Bochner integrable, its expectation is defined by
$$E[X] = \int_\Omega X \, d\mathbb{P},$$
and inherits the usual linearity and continuity properties of the classical expectation.

=== Stochastic process ===
Consider $(X_t)_{t\in T}$, a stochastic process that is Banach-space-valued. The Bochner integral allows us to define the mean function
$$\mu(t) = E[X_t] = \int_\Omega X_t \, d\mathbb{P}$$
whenever each $X_t$ is Bochner integrable. This approach is useful in stochastic partial differential equations, where each $X_t$ is a random element in a functional space.

In martingale theory, a sequence $(M_n)_{n\geq 1}$ of $B$-valued random variables is called a martingale with respect to a filtration $(\mathcal{F}_n)_{n\geq 1}$ if each $M_n$ is $\mathcal{F}_n$-measurable and Bochner integrable, and satisfies
$$E[M_{n+1} \mid \mathcal{F}_n] = M_n.$$
The Bochner integral ensures that conditional expectations are well-defined in this Banach space setting.

=== Gaussian measure ===
The Bochner integral allows one to define moments for the Gaussian measure on a Banach space. If the Bochner integral exists, then it is equivalent to the Pettis integral $\eta$ defined by
$$\langle \eta,b^*\rangle=\int_B \langle x, b^* \rangle \, d\mu(x),$$
where $b^* \in B^*$ and $\langle \cdot, \cdot \rangle$ denotes the dual pairing.

== Extension to locally convex spaces ==
There are several extensions of the Bochner integral to functions $f\colon X\to E$ with values in some locally convex space $E$ (1975 Rybakov, 1981 Blondia, 2015 Beckmann and Deitmar). The extension by Beckmann and Deitmar uses the original approach of Bochner but generalized to nets and they distinguish three cases of assumptions on the locally convex space:

- $E$ is complete,
- $E$ is quasi-complete space and the function $f\colon X\to E$ is bounded,
- $E$ ist quasi-complete and the measure $\mu(X)<\infty$ is finite.

Beckmann and Deitmar use the term of Bochner-approximability as a condition for defining the Bochner integral. A function is Bochner-approximable if there exists a net $(s_j)_{j\in J}$ of simple functions such that for every continuous seminorm $p$ on $E$

$$\int_X p(f-s_j)d\mu\to 0$$

They provide several equivalent characterizations of this property.

Blondia defines the extensions to locally convex spaces as follows

Let $(X,\Sigma,\mu)$ be $\sigma$-finite, complete measure space and $(E,\mathcal{P})$ a complete Hausdorff locally convex space whose topology is induced by the family of seminorms $\mathcal{P}$. A function $f\colon X\to E$ is called Bochner integrable or strong integrable if there exists a sequence $(f_n)$ such that

- $f_n(\omega)\to f(\omega)$ for $\omega\in X$ $\mu$-almost surely
- $p(f(\omega)-f_n(\omega))\in L^1(X;\mathbb{R})$ for each $n\in \mathbb{N}$ and alle $p\in \mathcal{P}$, i.e.

$$\lim\limits_{n\to \infty}\int_{X} p(f(\omega)-f_n(\omega))d\mu=0.$$

- $\int_A f_n(\omega) d\mu$ converges for each measurable subset $A$ of $X$.

== See also ==
- Bochner space – Type of topological space
- Bochner measurable function
- Pettis integral
- Vector measure – Generalization of finite measure to Banach spaces
- Weakly measurable function
