= Delta-convergence =

In mathematics, Delta-convergence, or Δ-convergence, is a mode of convergence in metric spaces, weaker than the usual metric convergence, and similar to (but distinct from) the weak convergence in Banach spaces. In Hilbert space, Delta-convergence and weak convergence coincide. For a general class of spaces, similarly to weak convergence, every bounded sequence has a Delta-convergent subsequence. Delta convergence was first introduced by Teck-Cheong Lim, and, soon after, under the name of almost convergence, by Tadeusz Kuczumow.

== Definition ==
A sequence $(x_k)$ in a metric space $(X,d)$ is said to be Δ-convergent to $x\in X$ if for every $y\in X$, $\limsup(d(x_k,x)-d(x_k,y))\le 0$.

== Characterization in Banach spaces ==
If $X$ is a uniformly convex and uniformly smooth Banach space, with the duality mapping $x\mapsto x^*$ given by $\|x\|=\|x^*\|$, $\langle x^*,x\rangle=\|x\|^2$, then a sequence $(x_k)\subset X$ is Delta-convergent to $x$ if and only if $(x_k-x)^*$ converges to zero weakly in the dual space $X^*$ (see). In particular, Delta-convergence and weak convergence coincide if $X$ is a Hilbert space.

=== Opial property ===
Coincidence of weak convergence and Delta-convergence is equivalent, for uniformly convex Banach spaces, to the well-known Opial property

== Delta-compactness theorem ==
The Delta-compactness theorem of T. C. Lim states that if $(X,d)$ is an asymptotically complete metric space, then every bounded sequence in $X$ has a Delta-convergent subsequence.

The Delta-compactness theorem is similar to the Banach–Alaoglu theorem for weak convergence but, unlike the Banach-Alaoglu theorem (in the non-separable case) its proof does not depend on the Axiom of Choice.

=== Asymptotic center and asymptotic completeness ===
An asymptotic center of a sequence $(x_k)_{k\in\mathbb N}$, if it exists, is a limit of the Chebyshev centers $c_n$ for truncated sequences $(x_k)_{k\ge n}$. A metric space is called asymptotically complete, if any bounded sequence in it has an asymptotic center.

=== Uniform convexity as sufficient condition of asymptotic completeness ===
Condition of asymptotic completeness in the Delta-compactness theorem is satisfied by uniformly convex Banach spaces, and more generally, by uniformly rotund metric spaces as defined by J. Staples.
