= Graustein =

Graustein is a surname. Notable people with the surname include:

- Mary Graustein, American mathematician
- William Caspar Graustein (1888–1941), American mathematician, husband of the above
