= Modulus and characteristic of convexity =

In mathematics, the modulus of convexity and the characteristic of convexity are measures of "how convex" the unit ball in a Banach space is. In some sense, the modulus of convexity has the same relationship to the ε-δ definition of uniform convexity as the modulus of continuity does to the ε-δ definition of continuity.

== Definitions ==
The modulus of convexity of a Banach space (X, ||⋅||) is the function δ : [0, 2] → [0, 1] defined by

$$\delta (\varepsilon) = \inf \left\{ 1 - \left\| \frac{x + y}{2} \right\| \,:\,  x, y \in S, \| x - y \| \geq \varepsilon \right\},$$

where S denotes the unit sphere of (X, || ||). In the definition of δ(ε), one can as well take the infimum over all vectors x, y in X such that ǁxǁ, ǁyǁ ≤ 1 and ǁx − yǁ ≥ ε.

The characteristic of convexity of the space (X, || ||) is the number ε_{0} defined by

$$\varepsilon_{0} = \sup \{ \varepsilon \,:\, \delta(\varepsilon) = 0 \}.$$

These notions are implicit in the general study of uniform convexity by J. A. Clarkson (Clarkson (1936); this is the same paper containing the statements of Clarkson's inequalities). The term "modulus of convexity" appears to be due to M. M. Day.

== Properties ==
- The modulus of convexity, δ(ε), is a non-decreasing function of ε, and the quotient δ(ε) / ε is also non-decreasing on (0, 2]. The modulus of convexity need not itself be a convex function of ε. However, the modulus of convexity is equivalent to a convex function in the following sense: there exists a convex function δ_{1}(ε) such that

$$\delta(\varepsilon / 2) \le \delta_1(\varepsilon) \le \delta(\varepsilon), \quad \varepsilon \in [0, 2].$$

- The normed space (X, ǁ ⋅ ǁ) is uniformly convex if and only if δ(ε) > 0 for every ε > 0.
- The Banach space (X, ǁ ⋅ ǁ) is a strictly convex space (i.e., the boundary of the unit ball B contains no line segments) if and only if δ(2) = 1, i.e., if only antipodal points (of the form x and y = −x) of the unit sphere can have distance equal to 2.
- When X is uniformly convex, it admits an equivalent norm with power type modulus of convexity. Namely, there exists q ≥ 2 and a constant c > 0 such that

$$\delta(\varepsilon) \ge c \, \varepsilon^q, \quad \varepsilon \in [0, 2].$$

== Modulus of convexity of the L^{P} spaces ==
The modulus of convexity is known for the L^{P} spaces. If $1<p\le2$, then it satisfies the following implicit equation:

$$\left(1-\delta_p(\varepsilon)+\frac{\varepsilon}{2}\right)^p+\left(1-\delta_p(\varepsilon)-\frac{\varepsilon}{2}\right)^p=2.$$

Knowing that $\delta_p(\varepsilon+)=0,$ one can suppose that $\delta_p(\varepsilon)=a_0\varepsilon+a_1\varepsilon^2+\cdots$. Substituting this into the above, and expanding the left-hand-side as a Taylor series around $\varepsilon=0$, one can calculate the $a_i$ coefficients:

$$\delta_p(\varepsilon)=\frac{p-1}{8}\varepsilon^2+\frac{1}{384}(3-10p+9p^2-2p^3)\varepsilon^4+\cdots.$$

For $2<p<\infty$, one has the explicit expression

$$\delta_p(\varepsilon)=1-\left(1-\left(\frac{\varepsilon}{2}\right)^p\right)^{\frac1p}.$$

Therefore, $\delta_p(\varepsilon)=\frac{1}{p2^p}\varepsilon^p+\cdots$.

== See also ==
- Uniformly smooth space
