= Zonoid =

Class of convex shapes

In convex geometry, a zonoid is a type of centrally symmetric convex body.

== Definitions ==
The zonoids have several definitions, equivalent up to translations of the resulting shapes:

- A zonoid is a shape that can be approximated arbitrarily closely (in Hausdorff distance) by a zonotope, a convex polytope formed from the Minkowski sum of finitely many line segments. In particular, every zonotope is a zonoid. Approximating a zonoid to within Hausdorff distance $\varepsilon$ requires a number of segments that (for fixed $\varepsilon$) is near-linear in the dimension, or linear with some additional assumptions on the zonoid.
- A zonoid is the range of an atom-free vector-valued sigma-additive set function. Here, a function from a family of sets to vectors is sigma-additive when the family is closed under countable disjoint unions, and when the value of the function on a union of sets equals the sum of its values on the sets. It is atom-free when every set whose function value is nonzero has a proper subset whose value remains nonzero. For this definition the resulting shapes contain the origin, but they may be translated arbitrarily as long as they contain the origin. The statement that the shapes described in this way are closed and convex is known as Lyapunov's theorem.
- A zonoid is the convex hull of the range of a vector-valued sigma-additive set function. For this definition, being atom-free is not required.
- A zonoid is the polar body of a central section of the unit ball of $L^1([0,1])$, the space of Lebesgue integrable functions on the unit interval. Here, a central section is the intersection of this ball with a finite-dimensional subspace of $L^1([0,1])$. This definition produces zonoids whose center of symmetry is at the origin.
- A zonoid is a convex set whose polar body is a projection body.
- A zonoid is a convex body whose support function is the cosine transform of an even non negative measure on the unit sphere.

== Examples ==
Every two-dimensional centrally-symmetric convex shape is a zonoid. In higher dimensions, the Euclidean unit ball is a zonoid. A polytope is a zonoid if and only if it is a zonotope, in which case all of its faces are also zonotopes. Thus, for instance, the regular octahedron is an example of a centrally symmetric convex shape that is not a zonoid.

The solid of revolution of the positive part of a sine curve is a zonoid, obtained as a limit of zonohedra whose generating segments are symmetric to each other with respect to rotations around a common axis. The bicones provide examples of centrally symmetric solids of revolution that are not zonoids.

== Properties ==
Zonoids are closed under affine transformations, under parallel projection, and under finite Minkowski sums. Every zonoid that is not a line segment can be decomposed as a Minkowski sum of other zonoids that do not have the same shape as the given zonoid. (This means that they are not translates of homothetes of the given zonoid.)

The zonotopes can be characterized as polytopes having centrally-symmetric pairs of opposite faces, and the zonoid problem is the problem of finding an analogous characterization of zonoids. Ethan Bolker credits the formulation of this problem to a 1916 publication of Wilhelm Blaschke.
