= James A. Clarkson =

American mathematician

- Education: Brown University
- Known for: Clarkson's inequalities
- Scientific career
- Fields: Mathematics
- Workplaces: Tufts University
- Thesis: On Definitions of Bounded Variation for Functions of Two Variables, On Double Riemann–Stieltjes Integrals (1934)
- Doctoral advisor: Clarence Raymond Adams

James Andrew Clarkson (7 February 1906 – 6 June 1970) was an American mathematician and professor of mathematics who specialized in number theory. He is known for proving inequalities in Hölder spaces, and derived from them, the uniform convexity of L^{p} spaces. His proofs are known in mathematics as Clarkson's inequalities. He was an operations' analyst during World War II, and was awarded the Medal of Freedom for his achievements. He wrote First reader on game theory, and many of his academic papers have been published in several scientific journals. He was an invited speaker at the 1932 International Congress of Mathematicians (ICM) in Zürich.

== Life ==
Originally from Massachusetts, in 1934 he received the Ph.D. in mathematics from Brown University, with the dissertation entitled On Definitions of Bounded Variation for Functions of Two Variables, On Double Riemann–Stieltjes Integrals under the supervision of advisor Clarence Raymond Adams.

In 1943, he was assigned as a bombing analyst at the Bombing Accuracy Subsection of the Operational Research Section (ORS) at the Headquarters Eighth Air Force division of the United States Air Force, alongside other mathematicians like Frank M. Stewart, J. W. T. Youngs, Ray E. Gilman, and W. J. Youden. He later received the Medal of Freedom.

From 1940 to 1948 he held a tenured appointment in the Department of Mathematics in the University of Pennsylvania and then from 1949 to 1970 he held a professorship at Tufts University.

Most of his academic papers and contributions have been published by the American Mathematical Society, and Duke Mathematical Journal.

== Academic papers ==
- James A. Clarkson (1948). "Book Review: The theory of functions of real variables". Bulletin of the American Mathematical Society. 54 (5): 487–490. doi:10.1090/S0002-9904-1948-09003-6.
- J. A. Clarkson (1947). "A property of derivatives". Bulletin of the American Mathematical Society. 53 (2): 124–126. doi:10.1090/S0002-9904-1947-08757-7.
- J. A. Clarkson; Erdős, P. (1943). "Approximation by polynomials". Duke Mathematical Journal. 10 (1): 5–11. doi:10.1215/S0012-7094-43-01002-6.
- C. Raymond Adams; James A. Clarkson (1939). "The Type of Certain Borel Sets in Several Banach Spaces". Transactions of the American Mathematical Society. 45 (2): 322. doi:10.2307/1990120. JSTOR 1990120.
- C. Raymond Adams; James A. Clarkson (1939). "A Correction to "Properties of Functions f(x, y) of Bounded Variation"". Transactions of the American Mathematical Society. 46 (3): 468. doi:10.2307/1989935. JSTOR 1989935.
- C. Raymond Adams; James A. Clarkson (1939). "The type of certain Borel sets in several Banach spaces". Transactions of the American Mathematical Society. 45 (2): 322. doi:10.1090/S0002-9947-1939-1501994-1.
- C. R. Adams; J. A. Clarkson (1939). "A correction to "Properties of functions f(x, y) of bounded variation"" (PDF). Transactions of the American Mathematical Society. 46: 468. doi:10.1090/S0002-9947-1939-0000283-4.
- James A. Clarkson (1936). "Uniformly Convex Spaces". Transactions of the American Mathematical Society. 40 (3): 396–414. doi:10.2307/1989630. JSTOR 1989630.
- J. A. Clarkson; W. C. Randels (1936). "Fourier series convergence criteria, as applied to continuous functions". Duke Mathematical Journal. 2 (1): 112–116. doi:10.1215/S0012-7094-36-00210-7.
- James A. Clarkson (1936). "Uniformly convex spaces". Transactions of the American Mathematical Society. 40 (3): 396–414. doi:10.1090/S0002-9947-1936-1501880-4.
- C. Raymond Adams; James A. Clarkson (1934). "Properties of Functions f(x, y) of Bounded Variation". Transactions of the American Mathematical Society. 36 (4): 711. doi:10.2307/1989819. JSTOR 1989819.
- C. R. Adams; J. A. Clarkson (1934). "On convergence in variation". Bulletin of the American Mathematical Society. 40 (6): 413–418. doi:10.1090/S0002-9904-1934-05874-9.
- C. Raymond Adams; James A. Clarkson (1934). "Properties of functions f(x, y) of bounded variation". Transactions of the American Mathematical Society. 36 (4): 711. doi:10.1090/S0002-9947-1934-1501762-6.
- James A. Clarkson; C. Raymond Adams (1933). "On Definitions of Bounded Variation for Functions of Two Variables". Transactions of the American Mathematical Society. 35 (4): 824. doi:10.2307/1989593. JSTOR 1989593.
- J. A. Clarkson (1933). "On double Riemann–Stieltjes integrals". Bulletin of the American Mathematical Society. 39 (12): 929–937. doi:10.1090/S0002-9904-1933-05771-3.
- J. A. Clarkson (1932). "A sufficient condition for the existence of a double limit". Bulletin of the American Mathematical Society. 38 (6): 391–393. doi:10.1090/S0002-9904-1932-05403-9.
- Clarkson, J. A. (1937). "The von Neumann–Jordan constant for the Lebesgue spaces". Annals of Mathematics. Second Series. 38 (1): 114–115. doi:10.2307/1968512. MR 1503327.

LCCN Permalink
OCLC 15215732, 227257702, 559697121
OCLC 559697139
