= Lp sum =

Measure in functional analysis

In mathematics, and specifically in functional analysis, the L^{p} sum of a family of Banach spaces is a way of turning a subset of the product set of the members of the family into a Banach space in its own right. The construction is motivated by the classical L^{p} spaces.

== Definition ==
Let $(X_i)_{i \in I}$ be a family of Banach spaces, where $I$ may have arbitrarily large cardinality. Set
$$P := \prod_{i \in I} X_i,$$
the product vector space.

The index set $I$ becomes a measure space when endowed with its counting measure (which we shall denote by $\mu$), and each element $(x_i)_{i \in I} \in P$ induces a function
$$I \to \Reals, i \mapsto \|x_i\|.$$

Thus, we may define a function
$$\Phi: P \to \Reals \cup \{\infty\}, (x_i)_{i \in I} \mapsto \int_I \|x_i\|^p \,d \mu(i)$$
and we then set
$$\sideset{}{^p}\bigoplus\limits_{i\in I} X_i := \{ (x_i)_{i \in I} \in P \mid \Phi((x_i)_{i \in I}) < \infty\}$$
together with the norm
$$\|(x_i)_{i \in I}\| := \left( \int_{i \in I} \|x_i\|^p \, d\mu(i) \right)^{1/p}.$$

The result is a normed Banach space, and this is precisely the L^{p} sum of $(X_i)_{i \in I}.$

== Properties ==
- Whenever infinitely many of the $X_i$ contain a nonzero element, the topology induced by the above norm is strictly in between product and box topology.
- Whenever infinitely many of the $X_i$ contain a nonzero element, the L^{p} sum is neither a product nor a coproduct.
