= Bochner measurable function =

In mathematics – specifically, in functional analysis – a Bochner-measurable function taking values in a Banach space is a function that equals almost everywhere the limit of a sequence of measurable countably-valued functions, i.e.,

$$f(t) = \lim_{n\rightarrow\infty}f_n(t)\text{ for almost every }t, \,$$

where the functions $f_n$ each have a countable range and for which the pre-image $f_n^{-1}(\{x\})$ is measurable for each element x. The concept is named after Salomon Bochner.

Bochner-measurable functions are sometimes called strongly measurable, $\mu$-measurable or just measurable (or uniformly measurable in case that the Banach space is the space of continuous linear operators between Banach spaces).

== Properties ==
The relationship between measurability and weak measurability is given by the following result, known as Pettis' theorem or Pettis measurability theorem.

Function f is almost surely separably valued (or essentially separably valued) if there exists a subset N ⊆ X with μ(N) = 0 such that f(X \ N) ⊆ B is separable.

A function f : X → B defined on a measure space (X, Σ, μ) and taking values in a Banach space B is (strongly) measurable (with respect to Σ and the Borel algebra on B) if and only if it is both weakly measurable and almost surely separably valued.

In the case that B is separable, since any subset of a separable Banach space is itself separable, one can take N above to be empty, and it follows that the notions of weak and strong measurability agree when B is separable.

== See also ==
- Bochner integral – Concept in mathematics
- Bochner space – Type of topological space
- Measurable function – Kind of mathematical function
- Measurable space – Basic object in measure theory; set and a sigma-algebra
- Pettis integral
- Vector measure
- Weakly measurable function
