= Strictly convex =

Strictly convex may refer to:

- Strictly convex function, a function having the line between any two points above its graph
- Strictly convex polygon, a polygon enclosing a strictly convex set of points
- Strictly convex set, a set whose interior contains the line between any two points
- Strictly convex space, a normed vector space for which the closed unit ball is a strictly convex set
