= Weakly measurable function =

In mathematics—specifically, in functional analysis—a weakly measurable function taking values in a Banach space is a function whose composition with any element of the dual space is a measurable function in the usual (strong) sense. For separable spaces, the notions of weak and strong measurability agree.

== Definition ==
If $(X, \Sigma)$ is a measurable space and $B$ is a Banach space over a field $\mathbb{K}$ (which is the real numbers $\R$ or complex numbers $\Complex$), then $f : X \to B$ is said to be weakly measurable if, for every continuous linear functional $g : B \to \mathbb{K},$ the function $g \circ f \colon X \to \mathbb{K} \quad \text{ defined by } \quad x \mapsto g(f(x))$ is a measurable function with respect to $\Sigma$ and the usual Borel $\sigma$-algebra on $\mathbb{K}.$

A measurable function on a probability space is usually referred to as a random variable (or random vector if it takes values in a vector space such as the Banach space $B$). Thus, as a special case of the above definition, if $(\Omega, \mathcal{P})$ is a probability space, then a function $Z : \Omega \to B$ is called a ($B$-valued) weak random variable (or weak random vector) if, for every continuous linear functional $g : B \to \mathbb{K},$ the function $g \circ Z \colon \Omega \to \mathbb{K} \quad \text{ defined by } \quad \omega \mapsto g(Z(\omega))$ is a $\mathbb{K}$-valued random variable (i.e. measurable function) in the usual sense, with respect to $\Sigma$ and the usual Borel $\sigma$-algebra on $\mathbb{K}.$

== Properties ==
The relationship between measurability and weak measurability is given by the following result, known as Pettis' theorem or Pettis measurability theorem.

A function $f$ is said to be almost surely separably valued (or essentially separably valued) if there exists a subset $N \subseteq X$ with $\mu(N) = 0$ such that $f(X \setminus N) \subseteq B$ is separable.

Theorem (Pettis, 1938)—A function $f : X \to B$ defined on a measure space $(X, \Sigma, \mu)$ and taking values in a Banach space $B$ is (strongly) measurable (that equals a.e. the limit of a sequence of measurable countably-valued functions) if and only if it is both weakly measurable and almost surely separably valued.

In the case that $B$ is separable, since any subset of a separable Banach space is itself separable, one can take $N$ above to be empty, and it follows that the notions of weak and strong measurability agree when $B$ is separable.

== See also ==
- Bochner measurable function
- Bochner integral – Concept in mathematics
- Bochner space – Type of topological space
- Pettis integral
- Vector measure
