= Simple function =

Function that attains finitely many values

In the mathematical field of real analysis, a simple function is a real (or complex)-valued function over a subset of the real line, similar to a step function. Simple functions are sufficiently "nice" that using them makes mathematical reasoning, theory, and proof easier. For example, simple functions attain only a finite number of values. Some authors also require simple functions to be measurable, as used in practice.

A basic example of a simple function is the floor function over the half-open interval [1, 9), whose only values are {1, 2, 3, 4, 5, 6, 7, 8}. A more advanced example is the Dirichlet function over the real line, which takes the value 1 if x is rational and 0 otherwise. (Thus the "simple" of "simple function" has a technical meaning somewhat at odds with common language.) All step functions are simple.

Simple functions are used as a first stage in the development of theories of integration, such as the Lebesgue integral, because it is easy to define integration for a simple function and also it is straightforward to approximate more general functions by sequences of simple functions.

== Definition ==
Formally, a simple function is a finite linear combination of indicator functions of measurable sets. More precisely, let (X, Σ) be a measurable space. Let A_{1}, ..., A_{n} ∈ Σ be a sequence of disjoint measurable sets, and let a_{1}, ..., a_{n} be a sequence of real or complex numbers. A simple function is a function $f\colon X \to \mathbb{C}$ of the form

$$f(x)=\sum_{k=1}^n a_k {\mathbf 1}_{A_k}(x),$$

where ${\mathbf 1}_A$ is the indicator function of the set A.

== Properties of simple functions ==
The sum, difference, and product of two simple functions are again simple functions, and multiplication by constant keeps a simple function simple; hence it follows that the collection of all simple functions on a given measurable space forms a commutative algebra over $\mathbb{C}$.

== Integration of simple functions ==
If a measure $\mu$ is defined on the space $(X, \Sigma)$, the integral of a simple function $f\colon X \to \mathbb R$ with respect to $\mu$ is defined to be

$$\int_X f d \mu = \sum_{k=1}^na_k\mu(A_k),$$

if all summands are finite.

== Relation to Lebesgue integration ==
The above integral of simple functions can be extended to a more general class of functions, which is how the Lebesgue integral is defined. This extension is based on the following fact.

Theorem. Any non-negative measurable function $f\colon X \to\mathbb{R}^{+}$ is the pointwise limit of a monotonic increasing sequence of non-negative simple functions.

It is implied in the statement that the sigma-algebra in the co-domain $\mathbb{R}^{+}$ is the restriction of the Borel σ-algebra $\mathfrak{B}(\mathbb{R})$ to $\mathbb{R}^{+}$. The proof proceeds as follows. Let $f$ be a non-negative measurable function defined over the measure space $(X, \Sigma,\mu)$. For each $n\in\mathbb N$, subdivide the co-domain of $f$ into $2^{2n}+1$ intervals, $2^{2n}$ of which have length $2^{-n}$. That is, for each $n$, define

$I_{n,k}=\left[\frac{k-1}{2^n},\frac{k}{2^n}\right)$ for $k=1,2,\ldots,2^{2n}$, and $I_{n,2^{2n}+1}=[2^n,\infty)$,

which are disjoint and cover the non-negative real line ($\mathbb{R}^{+} \subseteq \cup_{k}I_{n,k}, \forall n \in \mathbb{N}$).

Now define the sets

$A_{n,k}=f^{-1}(I_{n,k}) \,$ for $k=1,2,\ldots,2^{2n}+1,$

which are measurable ($A_{n,k}\in \Sigma$) because $f$ is assumed to be measurable.

Then the increasing sequence of simple functions

$$f_n=\sum_{k=1}^{2^{2n}+1}\frac{k-1}{2^n}{\mathbf 1}_{A_{n,k}}$$

converges pointwise to $f$ as $n\to\infty$. Note that, when $f$ is bounded, the convergence is uniform.

== See also ==
Bochner measurable function
