= Strongly measurable function =

Strong measurability has a number of different meanings, some of which are explained below.

== Values in Banach spaces ==
For a function f with values in a Banach space (or Fréchet space), strong measurability usually means Bochner measurability.

However, if the values of f lie in the space $\mathcal{L}(X,Y)$ of continuous linear operators from X to Y, then often strong measurability means that the operator f(x) is Bochner measurable for each fixed x in the domain of f, whereas the Bochner measurability of f is called uniform measurability (cf. "uniformly continuous" vs. "strongly continuous").

== Bounded operators ==
A family of bounded linear operators combined with the direct integral is strongly measurable, when each of the individual operators is strongly measurable.

== Semigroups ==
A semigroup of linear operators can be strongly measurable yet not strongly continuous. It is uniformly measurable if and only if it is uniformly continuous, i.e., if and only if its generator is bounded.
