= Rachel Blodgett Adams =

American mathematician

- Born: Rachel Blodgett; October 13, 1894; Woburn, Massachusetts, US
- Died: January 22, 1982 (aged 87); Providence, Rhode Island, US
- Education: Radcliffe College
- Occupations: Mathematician, professor
- Spouse: Clarence Raymond Adams

Rachel Blodgett Adams (October 13, 1894–January 22, 1982) was a pioneering American mathematician and one of the first women to earn a doctorate in mathematics at Radcliffe College in 1921.

== Biography ==
Rachel Blodgett was born in Woburn, Massachusetts, the oldest of three children of Mabel Edith Owen and William Edward Blodgett, neither of whom attended college.

After graduating from Woburn High School in 1912, she entered Wellesley College and majored in mathematics and Latin. In addition to her studies, she joined the school's Shakespeare Society and performed cornet in the symphony orchestra. Academically, she was gifted and was named a Wellesley scholar in 1914 and a Durant scholar in 1915.

Blodgett graduated with her bachelor's degree (B.A.) in 1916, and took courses at Harvard that summer. She then moved to Montreal, Quebec, Canada to teach math at Miss Edgar's and Miss Cramp's School until 1918. She then returned to Massachusetts to further pursue her academic and professional endeavors.

=== Research ===
For the next three years, Blodgett pursued advanced analysis at Radcliffe College, where she received an Edward Austin scholarship for at least two years and a Mary E. Horton fellowship for her final year. She worked with William Fogg Osgood and Oliver Dimon Kellogg. She earned her master's degree (M.A.) in 1919, and continued on to acquire her Ph.D. in mathematics in 1921. The following fall term, Dr. Blodgett took a teaching position at Wellesley.

Rachel Blodgett married Harvard-trained mathematician Clarence Raymond Adams (1898–1965) on August 17, 1922, in Eden Park, in Providence, Rhode Island. (He was widely known as "C.R. Adams.") At the time, C. R. Adams was a Sheldon traveling fellow from Harvard, which allowed the newly married couple to travel extensively overseas with stops in Rome and Göttingen, Germany. Upon their return to the U.S. in 1923, the two mathematicians settled down in Providence, Rhode Island, where C. R. established his career at Brown University and eventually headed the math department there.

Blodgett, now known as Dr. Rachel Adams, moved forward with her research for a few years, according to mathematician Judy Green,

"At least through the 1920s Adams continued her interest in integral equations. G. C. Evans of Rice Institute used information from her dissertation in an extensive review of a book on linear integral equations for the Monthly in 1927. She presented her results to the AMS in 1926 and published them in the American Journal in 1929."

Adams also spent many years tutoring math students at her alma mater, Radcliffe College, from 1926 to 1941, with her friend and colleague Mary Graustein, Ph.D., with the goal of encouraging young female students.

During World War II, Adams registered with the National Roster of Scientific and Specialized Personnel in Washington, D.C. to help with the war effort, but confirmation of any contribution she may have made as part of that program has not yet been found.

=== Later years ===
During their marriage, Rachel and C. R. Adams traveled extensively by automobile in the United States and Europe. The couple never had children. He died in 1965 at the age of 67.

She was 87 when she died in Providence, January 22, 1982.

== Legacy ==
In her estate plans, Rachel bequeathed to Wellesley College the Blodgett Fund, and stipulated that the fund's income be used for scholarships.

== Memberships ==
- Phi Beta Kappa
- Sigma Xi
- American Mathematical Society
- Mathematical Association of America

== Selected publications ==
- Blodgett, Rachel E. "Utilizing Industrial Ash to Stabilize Arsenic in Soil Contaminated From Chromated Copper Arsenate(CCA) Treated Wood." Masters Abstracts International. Vol. 50. No. 03. 2011.
- Blodgett, Rachel. The Determination of the Coefficients in Interpolation Formulae: And A Study of the Approximate Solution of Integral Equations. Dissertation, Radcliffe College, 1921.
- Adams, Rachel Blodgett (1929). On the Approximate Solution of Fredholm's Homogeneous Integral Equation. American Journal of Mathematics. 51(1): 139–148. doi:10.2307/2370568. ISSN 0002-9327.
