= Clarkson's inequalities =

Inequalities in measure theory

In mathematics, Clarkson's inequalities, named after James A. Clarkson, are results in the theory of L^{p} spaces. They give bounds for the L^{p}-norms of the sum and difference of two measurable functions in L^{p} in terms of the L^{p}-norms of those functions individually.

== Statement of the inequalities ==
Let $X$ be a measure space and let $f,g:X\to\R$ be measurable functions in $L^p$. Then, for $2\leq p < \infty$,

$$\left\| \frac{f + g}{2} \right\|^p + \left\| \frac{f - g}{2} \right\|^p \leq \frac{\| f \|^p + \| g \|^p}{2},$$

and for $1 < p < 2$,

$$\left\| \frac{f + g}{2} \right\|^q + \left\| \frac{f - g}{2} \right\|^q \leq \left( \frac{1}{2} \| f \|^p +\frac{1}{2} \| g \|^p \right)^\frac{q}{p},$$

where $p$ and $q$ are Hölder conjugates; that is,

$$\frac1{p} + \frac1{q} = 1.$$
