= Uniform convexity =

Uniform convexity can refer to:

- a uniformly convex space
- a uniformly convex function
