= Strictly convex space =

Normed vector space for which the closed unit ball is strictly convex

The unit ball in the middle figure is strictly convex, while the other two balls are not (they contain a line segment as part of their boundary).

In mathematics, a strictly convex space is a normed vector space (X, || ||) for which the closed unit ball is a strictly convex set. Put another way, a strictly convex space is one for which, given any two distinct points x and y on the unit sphere ∂B (i.e. the boundary of the unit ball B of X), the segment joining x and y meets ∂B only at x and y. Strict convexity is somewhere between an inner product space (all inner product spaces being strictly convex) and a general normed space in terms of structure. It also guarantees the uniqueness of a best approximation to an element in X (strictly convex) out of a convex subspace Y, provided that such an approximation exists.

If the normed space X is complete and satisfies the slightly stronger property of being uniformly convex (which implies strict convexity), then it is also reflexive by the Milman–Pettis theorem.

== Properties ==
The following properties are equivalent to strict convexity.

- A normed vector space (X, || ||) is strictly convex if and only if x ≠ y and || x || = || y || = 1 together imply that || x + y || < 2.
- A normed vector space (X, || ||) is strictly convex if and only if x ≠ y and || x || = || y || = 1 together imply that || αx + (1 − α)y || < 1 for all 0 < α < 1.
- A normed vector space (X, || ||) is strictly convex if and only if x ≠ 0 and y ≠ 0 and || x + y || = || x || + || y || together imply that x = cy for some constant c > 0;
- A normed vector space (X, || ||) is strictly convex if and only if the modulus of convexity δ for (X, || ||) satisfies δ(2) = 1.

== See also ==
- Uniformly convex space
- Modulus and characteristic of convexity
