= Vector measure =

Generalization of finite measure to Banach spaces

In mathematics, a vector measure is a function defined on a family of sets and taking vector values satisfying certain properties. It is a generalization of the concept of finite measure, which takes nonnegative real values only.

== Definitions and first consequences ==
Given a field of sets $(\Omega, \mathcal F)$ and a Banach space $X,$ a finitely additive vector measure (or measure, for short) is a function $\mu:\mathcal {F} \to X$ such that for any two disjoint sets $A$ and $B$ in $\mathcal{F}$ one has
$$\mu(A\cup B) =\mu(A) + \mu (B).$$

A vector measure $\mu$ is called countably additive if for any sequence $(A_i)_{i=1}^{\infty}$ of disjoint sets in $\mathcal F$ such that their union is in $\mathcal F$ it holds that
$$\mu{\left(\bigcup_{i=1}^\infty A_i\right)} = \sum_{i=1}^{\infty}\mu(A_i)$$
with the series on the right-hand side convergent in the norm of the Banach space $X.$

It can be proved that an additive vector measure $\mu$ is countably additive if and only if for any sequence $(A_i)_{i=1}^{\infty}$ as above one has

| $$\lim_{n\to\infty} \left\|\mu{\left(\bigcup_{i=n}^\infty A_i\right)}\right\| = 0,$$ | * |

where $\|\cdot\|$ is the norm on $X.$

Countably additive vector measures defined on sigma-algebras are more general than finite measures, finite signed measures, and complex measures, which are countably additive functions taking values respectively on the real interval $[0, \infty),$ the set of real numbers, and the set of complex numbers.

== Examples ==
Consider the field of sets made up of the interval $[0, 1]$ together with the family $\mathcal F$ of all Lebesgue measurable sets contained in this interval. For any such set $A,$ define
$$\mu(A) = \chi_A$$
where $\chi_A$ is the indicator function of $A.$ Depending on where $\mu$ is declared to take values, two different outcomes are observed.

- $\mu,$ viewed as a function from $\mathcal F$ to the $L^p$-space $L^\infty([0, 1]),$ is a vector measure which is not countably-additive.
- $\mu,$ viewed as a function from $\mathcal F$ to the $L^p$-space $L^1([0, 1]),$ is a countably-additive vector measure.

Both of these statements follow quite easily from the criterion (*) stated above.

== The variation of a vector measure ==
Given a vector measure $\mu : \mathcal{F} \to X,$ the variation $|\mu|$ of $\mu$ is defined as
$$|\mu|(A)=\sup \sum_{i=1}^n \|\mu(A_i)\|$$
where the supremum is taken over all the partitions
$$A = \bigcup_{i=1}^n A_i$$
of $A$ into a finite number of disjoint sets, for all $A$ in $\mathcal{F}.$ Here, $\|\cdot\|$ is the norm on $X.$

The variation of $\mu$ is a finitely additive function taking values in $[0, \infty].$ It holds that
$$\|\mu(A)\| \leq |\mu|(A)$$
for any $A$ in $\mathcal{F}.$ If $|\mu|(\Omega)$ is finite, the measure $\mu$ is said to be of bounded variation. One can prove that if $\mu$ is a vector measure of bounded variation, then $\mu$ is countably additive if and only if $|\mu|$ is countably additive.

== Lyapunov's theorem ==
In the theory of vector measures, Lyapunov's theorem states that the range of a (non-atomic) finite-dimensional vector measure is closed and convex. In fact, the range of a non-atomic vector measure is a zonoid (the closed and convex set that is the limit of a convergent sequence of zonotopes). It is used in economics, in ("bang–bang") control theory, and in statistical theory. Lyapunov's theorem has been proved by using the Shapley–Folkman lemma, which has been viewed as a discrete analogue of Lyapunov's theorem.

== See also ==
- Bochner measurable function
- Bochner integral – Concept in mathematics
- Bochner space – Type of topological space
- Complex measure – Measure with complex values
- Signed measure – Generalized notion of measure in mathematics
- Vector-valued functions – Function valued in a vector space; typically a real or complex one
- Weakly measurable function

== Bibliography ==
- Cohn, Donald L. (1997) [1980]. Measure theory (reprint ed.). Boston–Basel–Stuttgart: Birkhäuser Verlag. pp. IX+373. ISBN 3-7643-3003-1. Zbl 0436.28001.
- Diestel, Joe; Uhl, Jerry J. Jr. (1977). Vector measures. Mathematical Surveys. Vol. 15. Providence, R.I: American Mathematical Society. pp. xiii+322. ISBN 0-8218-1515-6.
- Kluvánek, I., Knowles, G, Vector Measures and Control Systems, North-Holland Mathematics Studies 20, Amsterdam, 1976.
- van Dulst, D. (2001) [1994], "Vector measures", Encyclopedia of Mathematics, EMS Press
- Rudin, W (1973). Functional analysis. New York: McGraw-Hill. p. 114. ISBN 9780070542259.
