= William Caspar Graustein =

American mathematician (1888-1941)

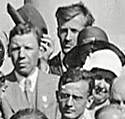
- Left to right, upper: Graustein, Smith, lower: Rellich, Mary Graustein, at the ICM, Zürich 1932.
- Born: 15 November 1888; Cambridge, Massachusetts
- Died: 22 January 1941 (aged 52); Cambridge, Massachusetts
- Education: Harvard University
- Spouse: Mary Florence (nee Curtis)
- Scientific career
- Fields: Mathematics
- Workplaces: Harvard University
- Doctoral advisor: Eduard Study

William Caspar Graustein (15 November 1888 – 22 January 1941) was an American mathematician. He graduated magna cum laude from Harvard University in 1910 and later became an instructor at Harvard University. In 1921, he married Mary Curtis Graustein (1884—1972), who was the first American woman to earn a mathematics Ph.D. (1917) from Radcliffe College.

He died in an automobile accident, at the age of 52. At the time, Graustein was professor of mathematics and assistant dean at Harvard.

== Bibliography ==
Some of his books and papers are:

- The scientific work of Joseph Lipka
- Applicability with preservation of both curvatures
- Extensions of the four-vertex theorem
- Introduction to higher geometry
- Differential Geometry MacMillan Company 1935. Republished Dover 1966 2006.
