= Lp space =

Function spaces generalizing finite-dimensional p norm spaces

In mathematics, the L^{p} spaces are function spaces defined using a natural generalization of the p-norm for finite-dimensional vector spaces. They are sometimes called Lebesgue spaces, named after Henri Lebesgue (Dunford & Schwartz 1958, III.3), although according to the Bourbaki group (Bourbaki 1987) they were first introduced by Frigyes Riesz (Riesz 1910).

L^{p} spaces form an important class of Banach spaces in functional analysis, and of topological vector spaces. Because of their key role in the mathematical analysis of measure and probability spaces, Lebesgue spaces are used also in the theoretical discussion of problems in physics, statistics, economics, finance, engineering, and other disciplines.

== Preliminaries ==
An animated gif of p-norms 0.1 through 2.

=== The p-norm in finite dimensions ===
The Euclidean length of a vector $x = (x_1, x_2, \dots, x_n)$ in the $n$-dimensional real vector space $\Reals^n$ is given by the Euclidean norm:
$$\|x\|_2 = \left({x_1}^2 + {x_2}^2 + \dotsb + {x_n}^2\right)^{1/2}.$$

The Euclidean distance between two points $x$ and $y$ is the length $\|x - y\|_2$ of the straight line between the two points. In many situations, the Euclidean distance is appropriate for capturing the actual distances in a given space. In contrast, consider taxi drivers in a grid street plan who should measure distance not in terms of the length of the straight line to their destination, but in terms of the rectilinear distance, which takes into account that streets are either orthogonal or parallel to each other. The class of $p$-norms generalizes these two examples and has an abundance of applications in many parts of mathematics, physics, and computer science.

For a real number $p \geq 1,$ the $p$-norm or $L^p$-norm of $x$ is defined by
$$\|x\|_p = \left(|x_1|^p + |x_2|^p + \dotsb + |x_n|^p\right)^{1/p}.$$
The absolute value bars can be dropped when $p$ is an even integer, and $x$ is drawn from the set of real numbers, or one of its subsets.

The Euclidean norm from above falls into this class and is the $2$-norm, and the $1$-norm is the norm that corresponds to the rectilinear distance.

The $L^\infty$-norm or maximum norm (or uniform norm) is the limit of the $L^p$-norms for $p \to \infty$, given by:
$$\|x\|_\infty = \max \left\{|x_1|, |x_2|, \dotsc, |x_n|\right\}$$

For all $p \geq 1,$ the $p$-norms and maximum norm satisfy the properties of a "length function" (or norm), that is:

- only the zero vector has zero length,
- the length of the vector is positive homogeneous with respect to multiplication by a scalar (positive homogeneity), and
- the length of the sum of two vectors is no larger than the sum of lengths of the vectors (triangle inequality).

Abstractly speaking, this means that $\Reals^n$ together with the $p$-norm is a normed vector space. Moreover, it turns out that this space is complete, thus making it a Banach space.

==== Relations between p-norms ====
The grid distance or rectilinear distance (sometimes called the "Manhattan distance") between two points is never shorter than the length of the line segment between them (the Euclidean or "as the crow flies" distance). Formally, this means that the Euclidean norm of any vector is bounded by its 1-norm:
$$\|x\|_2 \leq \|x\|_1 .$$

This fact generalizes to $p$-norms in that the $p$-norm $\|x\|_p$ of any given vector $x$ does not grow with $p$:

$\|x\|_{p+a} \leq \|x\|_p$ for any vector $x$ and real numbers $p \geq 1$ and $a \geq 0.$ (In fact this remains true for $0 < p < 1$ and $a \geq 0$ .)

For the opposite direction, the following relation between the $1$-norm and the $2$-norm is known:
$$\|x\|_1 \leq \sqrt{n} \|x\|_2 ~.$$

This inequality depends on the dimension $n$ of the underlying vector space and follows directly from the Cauchy–Schwarz inequality.

In general, for vectors in $\Complex^n$ where $0 < r < p:$
$$\|x\|_p \leq \|x\|_r \leq n^{\frac{1}{r} - \frac{1}{p}} \|x\|_p ~.$$

This is a consequence of Hölder's inequality.

==== When 0 < p < 1 ====
Illustrations of unit circles (see also superellipse) in $\Reals^2$ based on different $p$-norms (every vector from the origin to the unit circle has a length of one, the length being calculated with length-formula of the corresponding $p$).

Astroid, unit circle in $p = \tfrac{2}{3}$ metric

In $\Reals^n$ for $n > 1,$ the formula
$$\|x\|_p = \left(|x_1|^p + |x_2| ^p + \cdots + |x_n|^p\right)^{1/p}$$
defines an absolutely homogeneous function for $0 < p < 1;$ however, the resulting function does not define a norm, because it is not subadditive. On the other hand, the formula
$$|x_1|^p + |x_2|^p + \dotsb + |x_n|^p$$
defines a subadditive function at the cost of losing absolute homogeneity. It does define an F-norm, though, which is homogeneous of degree $p.$

Hence, the function
$$d_p(x, y) = \sum_{i=1}^n |x_i - y_i|^p$$
defines a metric. The metric space $(\Reals^n, d_p)$ is denoted by $\ell_n^p.$

Although the $p$-unit ball $B_n^p$ around the origin in this metric is "concave", the topology defined on $\Reals^n$ by the metric $B_p$ is the usual vector space topology of $\Reals^n,$ hence $\ell_n^p$ is a locally convex topological vector space. Beyond this qualitative statement, a quantitative way to measure the lack of convexity of $\ell_n^p$ is to denote by $C_p(n)$ the smallest constant $C$ such that the scalar multiple $C \, B_n^p$ of the $p$-unit ball contains the convex hull of $B_n^p,$ which is equal to $B_n^1.$ The fact that for fixed $p < 1$ we have
$$C_p(n) = n^{\tfrac{1}{p} - 1} \to \infty, \quad \text{as } n \to \infty$$
shows that the infinite-dimensional sequence space $\ell^p$ defined below, is no longer locally convex.

==== When p = 0 ====
In the case $p=0$, no honest norm exists, and the replacement is an F-norm which is not locally convex. The F-norm can be given by
$$(x_n) \mapsto \|x\|:=d(0,x)=\sum_n \frac{|x_n|}{1 +|x_n|}.$$

Sometimes a different "norm" is defined, but the topology it defines is not the usual one:
$$\|x\| = |\{i | x_i\ne 0\}|.$$
This is the limit of the $d_p$ F-norms (defined in the previous section) as $p\to 0^+$. It gives the Hamming distance on the set.

== ℓ^{p} spaces and sequence spaces ==
The $p$-norm can be extended to vectors that have an infinite number of components (sequences), which yields the space $\ell^p.$ This contains as special cases:

- $\ell^1,$ the space of sequences whose series are absolutely convergent,
- $\ell^2,$ the space of square-summable sequences, which is a Hilbert space, and
- $\ell^\infty,$ the space of bounded sequences.

The space of sequences has a natural vector space structure by applying scalar addition and multiplication. Explicitly, the vector sum and the scalar action for infinite sequences of real (or complex) numbers are given by:
$$\begin{align}
& (x_1, x_2, \ldots, x_n, x_{n+1},\ldots)+(y_1, y_2, \ldots, y_n, y_{n+1},\ldots) \\
= {} & (x_1+y_1, x_2+y_2, \ldots, x_n+y_n, x_{n+1}+y_{n+1},\ldots), \\[6pt]
& \lambda \cdot \left (x_1, x_2, \ldots, x_n, x_{n+1},\ldots \right) \\
= {} & (\lambda x_1, \lambda x_2, \ldots, \lambda x_n, \lambda x_{n+1},\ldots).
\end{align}$$

Define the $p$-norm:
$$\|x\|_p = \left(|x_1|^p + |x_2|^p + \cdots +|x_n|^p + |x_{n+1}|^p + \cdots\right)^{1/p}$$

Here, a complication arises, namely that the series on the right is not always convergent, so for example, the sequence made up of only ones, $(1, 1, 1, \ldots),$ will have an infinite $p$-norm for $1 \leq p < \infty.$ The space $\ell^p$ is then defined as the set of all infinite sequences of real (or complex) numbers such that the $p$-norm is finite.

One can check that as $p$ increases, the set $\ell^p$ grows larger. For example, the sequence
$$\left(1, \frac{1}{2}, \ldots, \frac{1}{n}, \frac{1}{n+1}, \ldots\right)$$
is not in $\ell^1,$ but it is in $\ell^p$ for $p > 1,$ as the series
$$1^p + \frac{1}{2^p} + \cdots + \frac{1}{n^p} + \frac{1}{(n+1)^p} + \cdots,$$
diverges for $p = 1$ (the harmonic series), but is convergent for $p > 1.$

One also defines the $\infty$-norm using the supremum:
$$\|x\|_\infty = \sup(|x_1|, |x_2|, \dotsc, |x_n|,|x_{n+1}|, \ldots)$$
and the corresponding space $\ell^\infty$ of all bounded sequences. It turns out that
$$\|x\|_\infty = \lim_{p \to \infty} \|x\|_p$$
if the right-hand side is finite, or the left-hand side is infinite. Thus, we will consider $\ell^p$ spaces for $1 \leq p \leq \infty.$

The $p$-norm thus defined on $\ell^p$ is indeed a norm, and $\ell^p$ together with this norm is a Banach space.

=== General ℓ^{p}-space ===
In complete analogy to the preceding definition one can define the space $\ell^p(I)$ over a general index set $I$ (and $1 \leq p < \infty$) as
$$\ell^p(I) = \left\{(x_i)_{i\in I} \in \mathbb{K}^I : \sum_{i \in I} |x_i|^p < +\infty\right\},$$
where convergence on the right requires that only countably many summands are nonzero (see also Absolute convergence over sets). With the norm
$$\|x\|_p = \left(\sum_{i\in I} |x_i|^p\right)^{1/p}$$
the space $\ell^p(I)$ becomes a Banach space. In the case where $I$ is finite with $n$ elements, this construction yields $\Reals^n$ with the $p$-norm defined above. If $I$ is countably infinite, this is exactly the sequence space $\ell^p$ defined above. For uncountable sets $I$ this is a non-separable Banach space which can be seen as the locally convex direct limit of $\ell^p$-sequence spaces.

For $p = 2,$ the $\|\,\cdot\,\|_2$-norm is even induced by a canonical inner product $\langle \,\cdot,\,\cdot\rangle,$ called the Euclidean inner product, which means that $\|\mathbf{x}\|_2 = \sqrt{\langle\mathbf{x}, \mathbf{x}\rangle}$ holds for all vectors $\mathbf{x}.$ This inner product can be expressed in terms of the norm by using the polarization identity. On $\ell^2,$ it can be defined by
$$\langle \left(x_i\right)_{i}, \left(y_n\right)_{i} \rangle_{\ell^2} ~=~ \sum_i x_i \overline{y_i}.$$
Now consider the case $p = \infty.$ Define (Note: The condition $\sup\operatorname{range} |x| < + \infty.$ is not equivalent to $\sup\operatorname{range} |x|$ being finite, unless $X \neq \varnothing.$)
$$\ell^\infty(I)=\{x\in \mathbb K^I : \sup\operatorname{range}|x|<+\infty\},$$
where for all $x$ (Note: If $X = \varnothing$ then $\sup\operatorname{range} |x| = - \infty.$)
$$\|x\|_\infty\equiv\inf\{C \in \Reals_{\geq 0}:|x_i| \leq C\text{ for all } i \in I\} = \begin{cases}\sup\operatorname{range}|x|&\text{if } X\neq\varnothing,\\0&\text{if } X=\varnothing.\end{cases}$$

The index set $I$ can be turned into a measure space by giving it the discrete σ-algebra and the counting measure. Then the space $\ell^p(I)$ is just a special case of the more general $L^p$-space (defined below).

== L^{p} spaces and Lebesgue integrals ==
An $L^p$ space may be defined as a space of measurable functions for which the $p$-th power of the absolute value is Lebesgue integrable, where functions which agree almost everywhere are identified. More generally, let $(S, \Sigma, \mu)$ be a measure space and $1 \leq p \leq \infty.$ (Note: The definitions of $\|\cdot\|_p,$ $\mathcal{L}^p(S,\, \mu),$ and $L^p(S,\, \mu)$ can be extended to all $0 < p \leq \infty$ (rather than just $1 \leq p \leq \infty$), but it is only when $1 \leq p \leq \infty$ that $\|\cdot\|_p$ is guaranteed to be a norm (although $\|\cdot\|_p$ is a quasi-seminorm for all $0 < p \leq \infty,$).) When $p \neq \infty$, consider the set $\mathcal{L}^p(S,\, \mu)$ of all measurable functions $f$ from $S$ to $\Complex$ or $\Reals$ whose absolute value raised to the $p$-th power has a finite integral, or in symbols:
$$\|f\|_p ~\stackrel{\scriptscriptstyle\text{def}}{=}~ \left(\int_S |f|^p\;\mathrm{d}\mu\right)^{1/p} < \infty.$$

To define the set for $p = \infty,$ recall that two functions $f$ and $g$ defined on $S$ are said to be equal almost everywhere, written $f = g$ a.e., if the set $\{s \in S : f(s) \neq g(s)\}$ is measurable and has measure zero. Similarly, a measurable function $f$ (and its absolute value) is bounded (or dominated) almost everywhere by a real number $C,$ written $|f| \leq C$ a.e., if the (necessarily) measurable set $\{s \in S : |f(s)| > C\}$ has measure zero. The space $\mathcal{L}^\infty(S,\mu)$ is the set of all measurable functions $f$ that are bounded almost everywhere (by some real $C$) and $\|f\|_\infty$ is defined as the infimum of these bounds:
$$\|f\|_\infty ~\stackrel{\scriptscriptstyle\text{def}}{=}~ \inf \{C \in \Reals_{\geq 0} : |f(s)| \leq C \text{ for almost every } s\}.$$
When $\mu(S) \neq 0$ then this is the same as the essential supremum of the absolute value of $f$: (Note: If $\mu(S) = 0$ then $\operatorname{esssup}|f| = -\infty.$)
$$\|f\|_\infty ~=~ \begin{cases}\operatorname{esssup}|f| & \text{if } \mu(S) > 0,\\ 0 & \text{if } \mu(S) = 0.\end{cases}$$

For example, if $f$ is a measurable function that is equal to $0$ almost everywhere (Note: For example, if a non-empty measurable set $N \neq \varnothing$ of measure $\mu(N) = 0$ exists then its indicator function $\mathbf{1}_N$ satisfies $\|\mathbf{1}_N\|_p = 0$ although $\mathbf{1}_N \neq 0.$) then $\|f\|_p = 0$ for every $p$ and thus $f \in \mathcal{L}^p(S,\, \mu)$ for all $p.$

For every positive $p,$ the value under $\|\,\cdot\,\|_p$ of a measurable function $f$ and its absolute value $|f| : S \to [0, \infty]$ are always the same (that is, $\|f\|_p = \||f|\|_p$ for all $p$) and so a measurable function belongs to $\mathcal{L}^p(S,\, \mu)$ if and only if its absolute value does. Because of this, many formulas involving $p$-norms are stated only for non-negative real-valued functions. Consider for example the identity $\|f\|_p^r = \|f^r\|_{p/r},$ which holds whenever $f \geq 0$ is measurable, $r > 0$ is real, and $0 < p \leq \infty$ (here $\infty / r \;\stackrel{\scriptscriptstyle\text{def}}{=}\; \infty$ when $p = \infty$). The non-negativity requirement $f \geq 0$ can be removed by substituting $|f|$ in for $f,$ which gives $\|\,|f|\,\|_p^r = \|\,|f|^r\,\|_{p/r}.$ Note in particular that when $p = r$ is finite then the formula $\|f\|_p^p = \||f|^p\|_1$ relates the $p$-norm to the $1$-norm.

Seminormed space of $p$-th power integrable functions

Each set of functions $\mathcal{L}^p(S,\, \mu)$ forms a vector space when addition and scalar multiplication are defined pointwise. (Note: Explicitly, the vector space operations are defined by: $$\begin{align} (f+g)(x) &= f(x)+g(x), \\ (s f)(x) &= s f(x) \end{align}$$ for all $f, g \in \mathcal{L}^p(S,\, \mu)$ and all scalars $s.$ These operations make $\mathcal{L}^p(S,\, \mu)$ into a vector space because if $s$ is any scalar and $f, g \in \mathcal{L}^p(S,\, \mu)$ then both $s f$ and $f + g$ also belong to $\mathcal{L}^p(S,\, \mu).$) That the sum of two $p$-th power integrable functions $f$ and $g$ is again $p$-th power integrable follows from $\|f + g\|_p^p \leq 2^{p-1} \left(\|f\|_p^p + \|g\|_p^p\right),$ (Note: When $1 \leq p < \infty,$ the inequality $\|f + g\|_p^p \leq 2^{p-1} \left(\|f\|_p^p + \|g\|_p^p\right)$ can be deduced from the fact that the function $F : [0, \infty) \to \Reals$ defined by $F(t) = t^p$ is convex, which by definition means that $F(t x + (1 - t) y) \leq t F(x) + (1 - t) F(y)$ for all $0 \leq t \leq 1$ and all $x, y$ in the domain of $F.$ Substituting $|f|, |g|,$ and $\tfrac{1}{2}$ in for $x, y,$ and $t$ gives $\left(\tfrac{1}{2}|f| + \tfrac{1}{2}|g|\right)^p \leq \tfrac{1}{2} |f|^p + \tfrac{1}{2} |g|^p,$ which proves that $(|f| + |g|)^p \leq 2^{p-1} (|f|^p + |g|^p).$ The triangle inequality $|f + g| \leq |f| + |g|$ now implies $|f + g|^p \leq 2^{p-1} (|f|^p + |g|^p).$ The desired inequality follows by integrating both sides. $\blacksquare$) although it is also a consequence of Minkowski's inequality
$$\|f + g\|_p \leq \|f\|_p + \|g\|_p$$
which establishes that $\|\cdot\|_p$ satisfies the triangle inequality for $1 \leq p \leq \infty$ (the triangle inequality does not hold for $0 < p < 1$). That $\mathcal{L}^p(S,\, \mu)$ is closed under scalar multiplication is due to $\|\cdot\|_p$ being absolutely homogeneous, which means that $\|s f\|_p = |s| \|f\|_p$ for every scalar $s$ and every function $f.$

Absolute homogeneity, the triangle inequality, and non-negativity are the defining properties of a seminorm. Thus $\|\cdot\|_p$ is a seminorm and the set $\mathcal{L}^p(S,\, \mu)$ of $p$-th power integrable functions together with the function $\|\cdot\|_p$ defines a seminormed vector space. In general, the seminorm $\|\cdot\|_p$ is not a norm because there might exist measurable functions $f$ that satisfy $\|f\|_p = 0$ but are not identically equal to $0$ ($\|\cdot\|_p$ is a norm if and only if no such $f$ exists).

Zero sets of $p$-seminorms

If $f$ is measurable and equals $0$ a.e. then $\|f\|_p = 0$ for all positive $p \leq \infty.$ On the other hand, if $f$ is a measurable function for which there exists some $0 < p \leq \infty$ such that $\|f\|_p = 0$ then $f = 0$ almost everywhere. When $p$ is finite then this follows from the $p = 1$ case and the formula $\|f\|_p^p = \||f|^p\|_1$ mentioned above.

Thus if $p \leq \infty$ is positive and $f$ is any measurable function, then $\|f\|_p = 0$ if and only if $f = 0$ almost everywhere. Since the right hand side ($f = 0$ a.e.) does not mention $p,$ it follows that all $\|\cdot\|_p$ have the same zero set (it does not depend on $p$). So denote this common set by
$$\mathcal{N} \;\stackrel{\scriptscriptstyle\text{def}}{=}\; \{f : f = 0 \ \mu\text{-almost everywhere} \} = \{f \in \mathcal{L}^p(S,\, \mu) : \|f\|_p = 0\} \qquad \forall \ p.$$
This set is a vector subspace of $\mathcal{L}^p(S,\, \mu)$ for every positive $p \leq \infty.$

Quotient vector space

Like every seminorm, the seminorm $\|\cdot\|_p$ induces a norm (defined shortly) on the canonical quotient vector space of $\mathcal{L}^p(S,\, \mu)$ by its vector subspace $\mathcal{N} = \{f \in \mathcal{L}^p(S,\, \mu) : \|f\|_p = 0\}.$ This normed quotient space is called Lebesgue space and it is the subject of this article. We begin by defining the quotient vector space.

Given any $f \in \mathcal{L}^p(S,\, \mu),$ the coset $f + \mathcal{N} \;\stackrel{\scriptscriptstyle\text{def}}{=}\; \{f + h : h \in \mathcal{N}\}$ consists of all measurable functions $g$ that are equal to $f$ almost everywhere. The set of all cosets, typically denoted by
$$\mathcal{L}^p(S, \mu) / \mathcal{N} ~~\stackrel{\scriptscriptstyle\text{def}}{=}~~ \{f + \mathcal{N} : f \in \mathcal{L}^p(S, \mu)\},$$
forms a vector space with origin $0 + \mathcal{N} = \mathcal{N}$ when vector addition and scalar multiplication are defined by $(f + \mathcal{N}) + (g + \mathcal{N}) \;\stackrel{\scriptscriptstyle\text{def}}{=}\; (f + g) + \mathcal{N}$ and $s (f + \mathcal{N}) \;\stackrel{\scriptscriptstyle\text{def}}{=}\; (s f) + \mathcal{N}.$ This particular quotient vector space will be denoted by
$$L^p(S,\, \mu) ~\stackrel{\scriptscriptstyle\text{def}}{=}~ \mathcal{L}^p(S, \mu) / \mathcal{N}.$$
Two cosets are equal $f + \mathcal{N} = g + \mathcal{N}$ if and only if $g \in f + \mathcal{N}$ (or equivalently, $f - g \in \mathcal{N}$), which happens if and only if $f = g$ almost everywhere; if this is the case then $f$ and $g$ are identified in the quotient space. Hence, strictly speaking $L^p(S,\, \mu)$ consists of equivalence classes of functions.

The $p$-norm on the quotient vector space

Given any $f \in \mathcal{L}^p(S,\, \mu),$ the value of the seminorm $\|\cdot\|_p$ on the coset $f + \mathcal{N} = \{f + h : h \in \mathcal{N}\}$ is constant and equal to $\|f\|_p;$ denote this unique value by $\|f + \mathcal{N}\|_p,$ so that:
$$\|f + \mathcal{N}\|_p \;\stackrel{\scriptscriptstyle\text{def}}{=}\; \|f\|_p.$$
This assignment $f + \mathcal{N} \mapsto \|f + \mathcal{N}\|_p$ defines a map, which will also be denoted by $\|\cdot\|_p,$ on the quotient vector space
$$L^p(S, \mu) ~~\stackrel{\scriptscriptstyle\text{def}}{=}~~ \mathcal{L}^p(S, \mu) / \mathcal{N} ~=~ \{f + \mathcal{N} : f \in \mathcal{L}^p(S, \mu)\}.$$
This map is a norm on $L^p(S, \mu)$ called the $p$-norm. The value $\|f + \mathcal{N}\|_p$ of a coset $f + \mathcal{N}$ is independent of the particular function $f$ that was chosen to represent the coset, meaning that if $\mathcal{C} \in L^p(S, \mu)$ is any coset then $\|\mathcal{C}\|_p = \|f\|_p$ for every $f \in \mathcal{C}$ (since $\mathcal{C} = f + \mathcal{N}$ for every $f \in \mathcal{C}$).

The Lebesgue $L^p$ space

The normed vector space $\left(L^p(S, \mu), \|\cdot\|_p\right)$ is called $L^p$ space or the Lebesgue space of $p$-th power integrable functions and it is a Banach space for every $1 \leq p \leq \infty$ (meaning that it is a complete metric space, a result that is sometimes called the Riesz–Fischer theorem). When the underlying measure space $S$ is understood then $L^p(S, \mu)$ is often abbreviated $L^p(\mu),$ or even just $L^p.$ Depending on the author, the subscript notation $L_p$ might denote either $L^p(S, \mu)$ or $L^{1/p}(S, \mu).$

If the seminorm $\|\cdot\|_p$ on $\mathcal{L}^p(S,\, \mu)$ happens to be a norm (which happens if and only if $\mathcal{N} = \{0\}$) then the normed space $\left(\mathcal{L}^p(S,\, \mu), \|\cdot\|_p\right)$ will be linearly isometrically isomorphic to the normed quotient space $\left(L^p(S, \mu), \|\cdot\|_p\right)$ via the canonical map $g \in \mathcal{L}^p(S,\, \mu) \mapsto \{g\}$ (since $g + \mathcal{N} = \{g\}$); in other words, they will be, up to a linear isometry, the same normed space and so they may both be called "$L^p$ space".

The above definitions generalize to Bochner spaces.

In general, this process cannot be reversed: there is no consistent way to define a "canonical" representative of each coset of $\mathcal{N}$ in $L^p.$ For $L^\infty,$ however, there is a theory of lifts enabling such recovery.

=== Special cases ===
For $1 \leq p \leq \infty$ the $\ell^p$ spaces are a special case of $L^p$ spaces; when $S$ are the natural numbers $\mathbb{N}$ and $\mu$ is the counting measure. More generally, if one considers any set $S$ with the counting measure, the resulting $L^p$ space is denoted $\ell^p(S).$ For example, $\ell^p(\mathbb{Z})$ is the space of all sequences indexed by the integers, and when defining the $p$-norm on such a space, one sums over all the integers. The space $\ell^p(n),$ where $n$ is the set with $n$ elements, is $\Reals^n$ with its $p$-norm as defined above.

Similar to $\ell^2$ spaces, $L^2$ is the only Hilbert space among $L^p$ spaces. In the complex case, the inner product on $L^2$ is defined by
$$\langle f, g \rangle = \int_S f(x) \overline{g(x)} \, \mathrm{d}\mu(x).$$
Functions in $L^2$ are sometimes called square-integrable functions, quadratically integrable functions or square-summable functions, but sometimes these terms are reserved for functions that are square-integrable in some other sense, such as in the sense of a Riemann integral (Titchmarsh 1976).

As any Hilbert space, every space $L^2$ is linearly isometric to a suitable $\ell^2(I),$ where the cardinality of the set $I$ is the cardinality of an arbitrary basis for this particular $L^2.$

If we use complex-valued functions, the space $L^\infty$ is a commutative C*-algebra with pointwise multiplication and conjugation. For many measure spaces, including all sigma-finite ones, it is in fact a commutative von Neumann algebra. An element of $L^\infty$ defines a bounded operator on any $L^p$ space by multiplication.

=== When 0 < p < 1 ===
If $0 < p < 1,$ then $L^p(\mu)$ can be defined as above, that is:
$$N_p(f) = \int_S |f|^p\, d\mu < \infty.$$
In this case, however, the $p$-norm $\|f\|_p = N_p(f)^{1/p}$ does not satisfy the triangle inequality and defines only a quasi-norm. The inequality $(a + b)^p \leq a^p + b^p,$ valid for $a, b \geq 0,$ implies that
$$N_p(f + g) \leq N_p(f) + N_p(g)$$
and so the function
$$d_p(f ,g) = N_p(f - g) = \|f - g\|_p^p$$
is a metric on $L^p(\mu).$ The resulting metric space is complete, but not locally convex.

In this setting $L^p$ satisfies a reverse Minkowski inequality, that is for $u, v \in L^p$
$$\Big\||u| + |v|\Big\|_p \geq \|u\|_p + \|v\|_p$$

This result may be used to prove Clarkson's inequalities, which are in turn used to establish the uniform convexity of the spaces $L^p$ for $1 < p < \infty$ (Adams & Fournier 2003).

The space $L^p$ for $0 < p < 1$ is an F-space: it admits a complete translation-invariant metric with respect to which the vector space operations are continuous. It is the prototypical example of an F-space that, for most reasonable measure spaces, is not locally convex: in $\ell^p$ or $L^p([0, 1]),$ every open convex set containing the $0$ function is unbounded for the $p$-quasi-norm; therefore, the $0$ vector does not possess a fundamental system of convex neighborhoods. Specifically, this is true if the measure space $S$ contains an infinite family of disjoint measurable sets of finite positive measure.

The only nonempty convex open set in $L^p([0, 1])$ is the entire space. Consequently, there are no nonzero continuous linear functionals on $L^p([0, 1]);$ the continuous dual space is the zero space. In the case of the counting measure on the natural numbers (i.e. $L^p(\mu) = \ell^p$), the bounded linear functionals on $\ell^p$ are exactly those that are bounded on $\ell^1$, i.e., those given by sequences in $\ell^\infty.$ Although $\ell^p$ does contain non-trivial convex open sets, it fails to have enough of them to give a base for the topology.

Having no linear functionals is highly undesirable for the purposes of doing analysis. In case of the Lebesgue measure on $\Reals^n,$ rather than work with $L^p$ for $0 < p < 1,$ it is common to work with the Hardy space H^{p} whenever possible, as this has quite a few linear functionals: enough to distinguish points from one another. However, the Hahn–Banach theorem still fails in H^{p} for $p < 1$ (Duren 1970, §7.5).

=== When p = 0 ===
For a finite measure space $(X,\mu)$, $L^0(\mu)$ is defined as the space of all $\mu$-measurable functions, with functions identified if they are equal almost everywhere. The F-norm is defined by
$$\|f\|_0 = \int_X \frac{|f(x)|}{1+|f(x)|}d\mu(x).$$
This is not a true norm. As with $0<p<1$, the topology it defines is not locally convex.

The space $\ell_0$ sometimes denotes the space of all sequences, with the F-norm
$$\|f\|_0 = \sum_n 2^{-n}\frac{|f_n|}{1+|f_n|}.$$
This is a special case of $L^0$ with a weighted measure on the positive integers.

== Properties ==
=== Hölder's inequality ===
Suppose $p, q, r \in [1, \infty]$ satisfy $\tfrac{1}{p} + \tfrac{1}{q} = \tfrac{1}{r}$. If $f \in L^p(S, \mu)$ and $g \in L^q(S, \mu)$ then $f g \in L^r(S, \mu)$ and
$$\|f g\|_r ~\leq~ \|f\|_p \, \|g\|_q.$$

This inequality, called Hölder's inequality, is in some sense optimal since if $r = 1$ and $f$ is a measurable function such that
$$\sup_{\|g\|_q \leq 1} \, \int_S |f g| \, \mathrm{d} \mu ~<~ \infty$$
where the supremum is taken over the closed unit ball of $L^q(S, \mu),$ then $f \in L^p(S, \mu)$ and
$$\|f\|_p ~=~ \sup_{\|g\|_q \leq 1} \, \int_S f g \, \mathrm{d} \mu.$$

=== Generalized Minkowski inequality ===
Minkowski inequality, which states that $\|\cdot\|_p$ satisfies the triangle inequality, can be generalized: If the measurable function $F : M \times N \to \Reals$ is non-negative (where $(M, \mu)$ and $(N, \nu)$ are measure spaces) then for all $1 \leq p \leq q \leq \infty,$
$$\left\|\left\|F(\,\cdot, n)\right\|_{L^p(M, \mu)}\right\|_{L^q(N, \nu)}
~\leq~ \left\|\left\|F(m, \cdot)\right\|_{L^q(N, \nu)}\right\|_{L^p(M, \mu)} \ .$$

=== Atomic decomposition ===
If $1 \leq p < \infty$ then every non-negative $f \in L^p(\mu)$ has an atomic decomposition, meaning that there exist a sequence $(r_n)_{n \in \Z}$ of non-negative real numbers and a sequence of non-negative functions $(f_n)_{n \in \Z},$ called the atoms, whose supports $\left(\operatorname{supp} f_n\right)_{n \in \Z}$ are pairwise disjoint sets of measure $\mu\left(\operatorname{supp} f_n\right) \leq 2^{n+1},$ such that
$$f ~=~ \sum_{n \in \Z} r_n \, f_n \, ,$$
and for every integer $n \in \Z,$
$$\|f_n\|_\infty ~\leq~ 2^{-\tfrac{n}{p}} \, ,$$
and
$$\tfrac{1}{2} \|f\|_p^p ~\leq~ \sum_{n \in \Z} r_n^p ~\leq~ 2 \|f\|^p_p \, ,$$
and where moreover, the sequence of functions $(r_n f_n)_{n \in\Z}$ depends only on $f$ (it is independent of $p$). These inequalities guarantee that $\|f_n\|_p^p \leq 2$ for all integers $n$ while the supports of $(f_n)_{n \in \Z}$ being pairwise disjoint implies
$$\|f\|_p^p ~=~ \sum_{n \in \Z} r_n^p \, \|f_n\|^p_p \, .$$

An atomic decomposition can be explicitly given by first defining for every integer $n \in \Z,$ (Note: This infimum is attained by $t_n;$ that is, $\mu(f > t_n) < 2^n$ holds.)
$$t_n = \inf \{t \in \Reals : \mu(f > t) < 2^n\}$$
and then letting
$$r_n ~=~ 2^{n/p} \, t_n ~ \text{ and } \quad f_n ~=~ \frac{f}{r_n} \, \mathbf{1}_{( t_{n+1} < f \leq t_n )}$$
where $\mu(f > t) = \mu(\{s : f(s) > t\})$ denotes the measure of the set $(f > t) := \{s \in S : f(s) > t\}$ and $\mathbf{1}_{(t_{n+1} < f \leq t_n)}$ denotes the indicator function of the set $(t_{n+1} < f \leq t_n) := \{s \in S : t_{n+1} < f(s) \leq t_n\}.$ The sequence $(t_n)_{n \in \Z}$ is decreasing and converges to $0$ as $n \to \infty.$ Consequently, if $t_n = 0$ then $t_{n+1} = 0$ and $(t_{n+1} < f \leq t_n) = \varnothing$ so that $f_n = \frac{1}{r_n} \, f \,\mathbf{1}_{(t_{n+1} < f \leq t_n)}$ is identically equal to $0$ (in particular, the division $\tfrac{1}{r_n}$ by $r_n = 0$ causes no issues).

The complementary cumulative distribution function $t \in \Reals \mapsto \mu(|f| > t)$ of $|f| = f$ that was used to define the $t_n$ also appears in the definition of the weak $L^p$-norm (given below) and can be used to express the $p$-norm $\|\cdot\|_p$ (for $1 \leq p < \infty$) of $f \in L^p(S, \mu)$ as the integral
$$\|f\|_p^p ~=~ p \, \int_0^\infty t^{p-1} \mu(|f| > t) \, \mathrm{d} t \, ,$$
where the integration is with respect to the usual Lebesgue measure on $(0, \infty).$

=== Dual spaces ===
The dual space of $L^p(\mu)$ for $1 < p < \infty$ has a natural isomorphism with $L^q(\mu),$ where $q$ is such that $\tfrac{1}{p} + \tfrac{1}{q} = 1$. This isomorphism associates $g \in L^q(\mu)$ with the functional $\kappa_p(g) \in L^p(\mu)^*$ defined by
$$f \mapsto \kappa_p(g)(f) = \int f g \, \mathrm{d}\mu$$
for every $f \in L^p(\mu).$

$\kappa_p : L^q(\mu) \to L^p(\mu)^*$ is a well defined continuous linear mapping which is an isometry by the extremal case of Hölder's inequality. If $(S,\Sigma,\mu)$ is a $\sigma$-finite measure space one can use the Radon–Nikodym theorem to show that any $G \in L^p(\mu)^*$ can be expressed this way, i.e., $\kappa_p$ is an isometric isomorphism of Banach spaces. Hence, it is usual to say simply that $L^q(\mu)$ is the continuous dual space of $L^p(\mu).$

For $1 < p < \infty,$ the space $L^p(\mu)$ is reflexive. Let $\kappa_p$ be as above and let $\kappa_q : L^p(\mu) \to L^q(\mu)^*$ be the corresponding linear isometry. Consider the map from $L^p(\mu)$ to $L^p(\mu)^{**},$ obtained by composing $\kappa_q$ with the transpose (or adjoint) of the inverse of $\kappa_p:$

$$j_p : L^p(\mu) \mathrel{\overset{\kappa_q}{\longrightarrow}} L^q(\mu)^* \mathrel{\overset{\left(\kappa_p^{-1}\right)^*}{\longrightarrow}} L^p(\mu)^{**}$$

This map coincides with the canonical embedding $J$ of $L^p(\mu)$ into its bidual. Moreover, the map $j_p$ is onto, as composition of two onto isometries, and this proves reflexivity.

If the measure $\mu$ on $S$ is sigma-finite, then the dual of $L^1(\mu)$ is isometrically isomorphic to $L^\infty(\mu)$ (more precisely, the map $\kappa_1$ corresponding to $p = 1$ is an isometry from $L^\infty(\mu)$ onto $L^1(\mu)^*.$

The dual of $L^\infty(\mu)$ is subtler. Elements of $L^\infty(\mu)^*$ can be identified with bounded signed finitely additive measures on $S$ that are absolutely continuous with respect to $\mu.$ See ba space for more details. If we assume the axiom of choice, this space is much bigger than $L^1(\mu)$ except in some trivial cases. However, Saharon Shelah proved that there are relatively consistent extensions of Zermelo–Fraenkel set theory (ZF + DC + "Every subset of the real numbers has the Baire property") in which the dual of $\ell^\infty$ is $\ell^1.$

=== Embeddings ===
Colloquially, if $1 \leq p < q \leq \infty,$ then $L^p(S, \mu)$ contains functions that are more locally singular, while elements of $L^q(S, \mu)$ can be more spread out. Consider the Lebesgue measure on the half line $(0, \infty).$ A continuous function in $L^1$ might blow up near $0$ but must decay sufficiently fast toward infinity. On the other hand, continuous functions in $L^\infty$ need not decay at all but no blow-up is allowed. More formally:

1. If $0<p<q<\infty$: $L^q(S, \mu) \subseteq L^p(S, \mu)$ if and only if $S$ does not contain sets of finite but arbitrarily large measure (e.g. any finite measure).
2. If $0<p<q\le\infty$: $L^p(S, \mu) \subseteq L^q(S, \mu)$ if and only if $S$ does not contain sets of non-zero but arbitrarily small measure (e.g. the counting measure).

Neither condition holds for the Lebesgue measure on the real line while both conditions holds for the counting measure on any finite set. As a consequence of the closed graph theorem, the embedding is continuous, i.e., the identity operator is a bounded linear map from $L^q$ to $L^p$ in the first case and $L^p$ to $L^q$ in the second. Indeed, if the domain $S$ has finite measure, one can make the following explicit calculation using Hölder's inequality
$$\ \|\mathbf{1}f^p\|_1 \leq \|\mathbf{1}\|_{q/(q-p)} \|f^p\|_{q/p}$$
leading to
$$\ \|f\|_p \leq \mu(S)^{1/p - 1/q} \|f\|_q .$$

The constant appearing in the above inequality is optimal, in the sense that the operator norm of the identity $I : L^q(S, \mu) \to L^p(S, \mu)$ is precisely
$$\|I\|_{q,p} = \mu(S)^{1/p - 1/q}$$
the case of equality being achieved exactly when $f = 1$ $\mu$-almost-everywhere.

=== Dense subspaces ===
Let $1 \leq p < \infty$ and $(S, \Sigma, \mu)$ be a measure space and consider an integrable simple function $f$ on $S$ given by
$$f = \sum_{j=1}^n a_j \mathbf{1}_{A_j},$$
where $a_j$ are scalars, $A_j \in \Sigma$ has finite measure and ${\mathbf 1}_{A_j}$ is the indicator function of the set $A_j,$ for $j = 1, \dots, n.$ By construction of the integral, the vector space of integrable simple functions is dense in $L^p(S, \Sigma, \mu).$

More can be said when $S$ is a normal topological space and $\Sigma$ its Borel 𝜎–algebra.

Suppose $V \subseteq S$ is an open set with $\mu(V) < \infty.$ Then for every Borel set $A \in \Sigma$ contained in $V$ there exist a closed set $F$ and an open set $U$ such that
$$F \subseteq A \subseteq U \subseteq V \quad \text{and} \quad \mu(U \setminus F)= \mu(U) - \mu(F)  < \varepsilon,$$
for every $\varepsilon > 0$. Subsequently, there exists a Urysohn function $0 \leq \varphi \leq 1$ on $S$ that is $1$ on $F$ and $0$ on $S \setminus U,$ with
$$\int_S |\mathbf{1}_A - \varphi| \, \mathrm{d}\mu < \varepsilon \, .$$

If $S$ can be covered by an increasing sequence $(V_n)$ of open sets that have finite measure, then the space of $p$–integrable continuous functions is dense in $L^p(S, \Sigma, \mu).$ More precisely, one can use bounded continuous functions that vanish outside one of the open sets $V_n.$

This applies in particular when $S = \Reals^d$ and when $\mu$ is the Lebesgue measure. For example, the space of continuous and compactly supported functions as well as the space of integrable step functions are dense in $L^p(\Reals^d)$.

=== Closed subspaces ===
If $0 < p < \infty$ is any positive real number, $\mu$ is a probability measure on a measurable space $(S, \Sigma)$ (so that $L^\infty(\mu) \subseteq L^p(\mu)$), and $V \subseteq L^\infty(\mu)$ is a vector subspace, then $V$ is a closed subspace of $L^p(\mu)$ if and only if $V$ is finite-dimensional ($V$ was chosen independent of $p$). In this theorem, which is due to Alexander Grothendieck, it is crucial that the vector space $V$ be a subset of $L^\infty$ since it is possible to construct an infinite-dimensional closed vector subspace of $L^1\left(S^1, \tfrac{1}{2\pi}\lambda\right)$ (which is even a subset of $L^4$), where $\lambda$ is Lebesgue measure on the unit circle $S^1$ and $\tfrac{1}{2\pi} \lambda$ is the probability measure that results from dividing it by its mass $\lambda(S^1) = 2 \pi.$

== Applications ==
=== Statistics ===
In statistics, measures of central tendency and statistical dispersion, such as the mean, median, and standard deviation, can be defined in terms of $L^p$ metrics, and measures of central tendency can be characterized as solutions to variational problems.

In penalized regression, "L1 penalty" and "L2 penalty" refer to penalizing either the $L^1$ norm of a solution's vector of parameter values (i.e. the sum of its absolute values), or its squared $L^2$ norm (its Euclidean length). Techniques which use an L1 penalty, like LASSO, encourage sparse solutions (where the many parameters are zero). Elastic net regularization uses a penalty term that is a combination of the $L^1$ norm and the squared $L^2$ norm of the parameter vector.

=== Hausdorff–Young inequality ===
The Fourier transform for the real line (or, for periodic functions, see Fourier series), maps $L^p(\Reals)$ to $L^q(\Reals)$ (or $L^p(\mathbf{T})$ to $\ell^q$) respectively, where $1 \leq p \leq 2$ and $\tfrac{1}{p} + \tfrac{1}{q} = 1.$ This is a consequence of the Riesz–Thorin interpolation theorem, and is made precise with the Hausdorff–Young inequality.

By contrast, if $p > 2,$ the Fourier transform does not map into $L^q.$

=== Hilbert spaces ===
Hilbert spaces are central to many applications, from quantum mechanics to stochastic calculus. The spaces $L^2$ and $\ell^2$ are both Hilbert spaces. In fact, by choosing a Hilbert basis $E,$ i.e., a maximal orthonormal subset of $L^2$ or any Hilbert space, one sees that every Hilbert space is isometrically isomorphic to $\ell^2(E)$ (same $E$ as above), i.e., a Hilbert space of type $\ell^2.$

== Generalizations and extensions ==
=== Weak L^{p} ===
Let $(S, \Sigma, \mu)$ be a measure space, and $f$ a measurable function with real or complex values on $S.$ The distribution function of $f$ is defined for $t \geq 0$ by
$$\lambda_f(t) = \mu\{x \in S : |f(x)| > t\}.$$

If $f$ is in $L^p(S, \mu)$ for some $p$ with $1 \leq p < \infty,$ then by Markov's inequality,
$$\lambda_f(t) \leq \frac{\|f\|_p^p}{t^p}$$

A function $f$ is said to be in the space weak $L^p(S, \mu)$, or $L^{p,w}(S, \mu),$ if there is a constant $C > 0$ such that, for all $t > 0,$
$$\lambda_f(t) \leq \frac{C^p}{t^p}$$

The best constant $C$ for this inequality is the $L^{p,w}$-norm of $f,$ and is denoted by
$$\|f\|_{p,w} = \sup_{t > 0} ~ t \lambda_f^{1/p}(t).$$

The weak $L^p$ coincide with the Lorentz spaces $L^{p,\infty},$ so this notation is also used to denote them.

The $L^{p,w}$-norm is not a true norm, since the triangle inequality fails to hold. Nevertheless, for $f$ in $L^p(S, \mu),$
$$\|f\|_{p,w} \leq \|f\|_p$$
and in particular $L^p(S, \mu) \subset L^{p,w}(S, \mu).$

In fact, one has
$$\|f\|^p_{L^p} = \int |f(x)|^p d\mu(x) \geq \int_{\{|f(x)| > t \}} t^p + \int_{\{|f(x)| \leq t \}} |f|^p \geq t^p \mu(\{|f| > t \}),$$
and raising to power $1/p$ and taking the supremum in $t$ one has
$$\|f\|_{L^p} \geq \sup_{t > 0} t \; \mu(\{|f| > t \})^{1/p} = \|f\|_{L^{p,w}}.$$

Under the convention that two functions are equal if they are equal $\mu$ almost everywhere, then the spaces $L^{p,w}$ are complete (Grafakos 2004).

For any $0 < r < p$ the expression
$$\|| f |\|_{L^{p,\infty}} = \sup_{0<\mu(E)<\infty} \mu(E)^{-1/r + 1/p} \left(\int_E |f|^r\, d\mu\right)^{1/r}$$
is comparable to the $L^{p,w}$-norm. Further in the case $p > 1,$ this expression defines a norm if $r = 1.$ Hence for $p > 1$ the weak $L^p$ spaces are Banach spaces (Grafakos 2004).

A major result that uses the $L^{p,w}$-spaces is the Marcinkiewicz interpolation theorem, which has broad applications to harmonic analysis and the study of singular integrals.

=== Weighted L^{p} spaces ===
As before, consider a measure space $(S, \Sigma, \mu).$ Let $w : S \to [a, \infty), a > 0$ be a measurable function. The $w$-weighted $L^p$ space is defined as $L^p(S, w \, \mathrm{d} \mu),$ where $w \, \mathrm{d} \mu$ means the measure $\nu$ defined by
$$\nu(A) \equiv \int_A w(x) \, \mathrm{d} \mu (x), \qquad A \in \Sigma,$$

or, in terms of the Radon–Nikodym derivative, $w = \tfrac{\mathrm{d} \nu}{\mathrm{d} \mu}$ the norm for $L^p(S, w \, \mathrm{d} \mu)$ is explicitly
$$\|u\|_{L^p(S, w \, \mathrm{d} \mu)} \equiv \left(\int_S w(x) |u(x)|^p \, \mathrm{d} \mu(x)\right)^{1/p}$$

As $L^p$-spaces, the weighted spaces have nothing special, since $L^p(S, w \, \mathrm{d} \mu)$ is equal to $L^p(S, \mathrm{d} \nu).$ But they are the natural framework for several results in harmonic analysis (Grafakos 2004); they appear for example in the Muckenhoupt theorem: for $1 < p < \infty,$ the classical Hilbert transform is defined on $L^p(\mathbf{T}, \lambda)$ where $\mathbf{T}$ denotes the unit circle and $\lambda$ the Lebesgue measure; the (nonlinear) Hardy–Littlewood maximal operator is bounded on $L^p(\Reals^n, \lambda).$ Muckenhoupt's theorem describes weights $w$ such that the Hilbert transform remains bounded on $L^p(\mathbf{T}, w \, \mathrm{d} \lambda)$ and the maximal operator on $L^p(\Reals^n, w \, \mathrm{d} \lambda).$

=== L^{p} spaces on manifolds ===
One may also define spaces $L^p(M)$ on a manifold, called the intrinsic $L^p$ spaces of the manifold, using densities.

=== Vector-valued L^{p} spaces ===
Given a measure space $(\Omega, \Sigma, \mu)$ and a locally convex space $E$ (here assumed to be complete), it is possible to define spaces of $p$-integrable $E$-valued functions on $\Omega$ in a number of ways. One way is to define the spaces of Bochner integrable and Pettis integrable functions, and then endow them with locally convex TVS-topologies that are (each in their own way) a natural generalization of the usual $L^p$ topology. Another way involves topological tensor products of $L^p(\Omega, \Sigma, \mu)$ with $E.$ Element of the vector space $L^p(\Omega, \Sigma, \mu) \otimes E$ are finite sums of simple tensors $f_1 \otimes e_1 + \cdots + f_n \otimes e_n,$ where each simple tensor $f \times e$ may be identified with the function $\Omega \to E$ that sends $x \mapsto e f(x).$ This tensor product $L^p(\Omega, \Sigma, \mu) \otimes E$ is then endowed with a locally convex topology that turns it into a topological tensor product, the most common of which are the projective tensor product, denoted by $L^p(\Omega, \Sigma, \mu) \otimes_\pi E,$ and the injective tensor product, denoted by $L^p(\Omega, \Sigma, \mu) \otimes_\varepsilon E.$ In general, neither of these space are complete so their completions are constructed, which are respectively denoted by $L^p(\Omega, \Sigma, \mu) \widehat{\otimes}_\pi E$ and $L^p(\Omega, \Sigma, \mu) \widehat{\otimes}_\varepsilon E$ (this is analogous to how the space of scalar-valued simple functions on $\Omega,$ when seminormed by any $\|\cdot\|_p,$ is not complete so a completion is constructed which, after being quotiented by $\ker \|\cdot\|_p,$ is isometrically isomorphic to the Banach space $L^p(\Omega, \mu)$). Alexander Grothendieck showed that when $E$ is a nuclear space (a concept he introduced), then these two constructions are, respectively, canonically TVS-isomorphic with the spaces of Bochner and Pettis integral functions mentioned earlier; in short, they are indistinguishable.

=== L^{0} space of measurable functions ===
The vector space of (equivalence classes of) measurable functions on $(S, \Sigma, \mu)$ is denoted $L^0(S, \Sigma, \mu)$ (Kalton, Peck & Roberts 1984). By definition, it contains all the $L^p,$ and is equipped with the topology of convergence in measure. When $\mu$ is a probability measure (i.e., $\mu(S) = 1$), this mode of convergence is named convergence in probability. The space $L^0$ is always a topological abelian group but is only a topological vector space if $\mu(S)<\infty.$ This is because scalar multiplication is continuous if and only if $\mu(S)<\infty.$ If $(S,\Sigma,\mu)$ is $\sigma$-finite then the weaker topology of local convergence in measure is an F-space, i.e. a completely metrizable topological vector space. Moreover, this topology is isometric to global convergence in measure $(S,\Sigma,\nu)$ for a suitable choice of probability measure $\nu.$

The description is easier when $\mu$ is finite. If $\mu$ is a finite measure on $(S, \Sigma),$ the $0$ function admits for the convergence in measure the following fundamental system of neighborhoods
$$V_\varepsilon = \Bigl\{f : \mu \bigl(\{x : |f(x)| > \varepsilon\} \bigr) < \varepsilon \Bigr\}, \qquad \varepsilon > 0.$$

The topology can be defined by any metric $d$ of the form
$$d(f, g) = \int_S \varphi \bigl(|f(x) - g(x)|\bigr)\, \mathrm{d}\mu(x)$$
where $\varphi$ is bounded continuous concave and non-decreasing on $[0, \infty),$ with $\varphi(0) = 0$ and $\varphi(t) > 0$ when $t > 0$ (for example, $\varphi(t) = \min(t, 1).$ Such a metric is called Lévy-metric for $L^0.$ Under this metric the space $L^0$ is complete. However, as mentioned above, scalar multiplication is continuous with respect to this metric only if $\mu(S)<\infty$. To see this, consider the Lebesgue measurable function $f:\mathbb R\rightarrow \mathbb R$ defined by $f(x)=x$. Then clearly $\lim_{c\rightarrow 0}d(cf,0)=\infty$. The space $L^0$ is in general not locally bounded, and not locally convex.

For the infinite Lebesgue measure $\lambda$ on $\Reals^n,$ the definition of the fundamental system of neighborhoods could be modified as follows
$$W_\varepsilon = \left\{f : \lambda \left(\left\{x : |f(x)| > \varepsilon \text{ and } |x| < \tfrac{1}{\varepsilon}\right\}\right) < \varepsilon\right\}$$

The resulting space $L^0(\Reals^n, \lambda)$, with the topology of local convergence in measure, is isomorphic to the space $L^0(\Reals^n, g \, \lambda),$ for any positive $\lambda$–integrable density $g.$

== See also ==
- Absolutely integrable function – Function whose absolute value has a finite integral
- Bochner space – Type of topological space
- Orlicz space – Type of function space
- Hardy space – Concept within complex analysis
- Riesz–Thorin theorem – Theorem on operator interpolation
- Hölder mean – N-th root of the arithmetic mean of the given numbers raised to the power n
- Hölder space – Type of continuity of a complex-valued function
- Root mean square – Square root of the mean square
- Least absolute deviations – Statistical optimality criterion
- Locally integrable function – Function which is integrable on its domain $\left( L^1_{\text{loc}}\right)$
- $L^p(G)$ spaces over a locally compact group $G$ – Duality for locally compact abelian groups
- Least-squares spectral analysis – Periodicity computation method
- List of Banach spaces
- Minkowski distance – Vector distance function
- L-infinity – Space of bounded sequences
- L^{p} sum – Measure in functional analysis
- C^{n} space – Degree of differentiability of a function or map
