= Opial property =

In mathematics, the Opial property is an abstract property of Banach spaces that plays an important role in the study of weak convergence of iterates of mappings of Banach spaces, and of the asymptotic behavior of nonlinear semigroups. The property is named after the Polish mathematician Zdzisław Opial.

== Definitions ==
Let (X, || ||) be a Banach space. X is said to have the Opial property if, whenever (x_{n})_{n∈N} is a sequence in X converging weakly to some x_{0} ∈ X and x ≠ x_{0}, it follows that

$$\liminf_{n \to \infty} \| x_{n} - x_{0} \| < \liminf_{n \to \infty} \| x_{n} - x \|.$$

Alternatively, using the contrapositive, this condition may be written as

$$\liminf_{n \to \infty} \| x_{n} - x \| \leq \liminf_{n \to \infty} \| x_{n} - x_{0} \| \implies x = x_{0}.$$

If X is the continuous dual space of some other Banach space Y, then X is said to have the weak-∗ Opial property if, whenever (x_{n})_{n∈N} is a sequence in X converging weakly-∗ to some x_{0} ∈ X and x ≠ x_{0}, it follows that

$$\liminf_{n \to \infty} \| x_{n} - x_{0} \| < \liminf_{n \to \infty} \| x_{n} - x \|,$$

or, as above,

$$\liminf_{n \to \infty} \| x_{n} - x \| \leq \liminf_{n \to \infty} \| x_{n} - x_{0} \| \implies x = x_{0}.$$

A (dual) Banach space X is said to have the uniform (weak-∗) Opial property if, for every c > 0, there exists an r > 0 such that

$$1 + r \leq \liminf_{n \to \infty} \| x_{n} - x \|$$

for every x ∈ X with ||x|| ≥ c and every sequence (x_{n})_{n∈N} in X converging weakly (weakly-∗) to 0 and with

$$\liminf_{n \to \infty} \| x_{n} \| \geq 1.$$

== Examples ==
- Opial's theorem (1967): Every Hilbert space has the Opial property.
- Sequence spaces $\ell^p$, $1\le p<\infty$, have the Opial property.
- Van Dulst theorem (1982): for every separable Banach space there is an equivalent norm that endows it with the Opial property.
- For uniformly convex Banach spaces, Opial property holds if and only if Delta-convergence coincides with weak convergence.
