= Billy James Pettis =

American mathematician (1913–1979)

Billy James Pettis (1913 – 14 April 1979), was an American mathematician, known for his contributions to functional analysis.

== See also ==
- Dunford–Pettis property
- Dunford–Pettis theorem
- Milman–Pettis theorem
- Orlicz–Pettis theorem
- Pettis integral
- Pettis theorem
