= Bochner space =

Type of topological space

In mathematics, Bochner spaces are a generalization of the concept of $L^p$ spaces to functions whose values lie in a Banach space which is not necessarily the space $\R$ or $\Complex$ of real or complex numbers.

The space $L^p(X)$ consists of (equivalence classes of) all Bochner measurable functions $f$ with values in the Banach space $X$ whose norm $\|f\|_X$ lies in the standard $L^p$ space. Thus, if $X$ is the set of complex numbers, it is the standard Lebesgue $L^p$ space.

Almost all standard results on $L^p$ spaces do hold on Bochner spaces too; in particular, the Bochner spaces $L^p(X)$ are Banach spaces for $1 \leq p \leq \infty.$

Bochner spaces are named for the mathematician Salomon Bochner.

== Definition ==
Given a measure space $(T, \Sigma; \mu),$ a Banach space $\left(X, \|\,\cdot\,\|_X\right)$ and $1 \leq p \leq \infty,$ the Bochner space $L^p(T; X)$ is defined to be the Kolmogorov quotient (by equality almost everywhere) of the space of all Bochner measurable functions $u : T \to X$ such that the corresponding norm is finite:
$$\|u\|_{L^p(T; X)} := \left( \int_{T} \| u(t) \|_{X}^{p} \, \mathrm{d} \mu (t) \right)^{1/p} < + \infty \mbox{ for } 1 \leq p < \infty,$$
$$\|u\|_{L^{\infty}(T; X)} := \mathrm{ess\,sup}_{t \in T} \|u(t)\|_{X} < + \infty.$$

In other words, as is usual in the study of $L^p$ spaces, $L^p(T; X)$ is a space of equivalence classes of functions, where two functions are defined to be equivalent if they are equal everywhere except upon a $\mu$-measure zero subset of $T.$ As is also usual in the study of such spaces, it is usual to abuse notation and speak of a "function" in $L^p(T; X)$ rather than an equivalence class (which would be more technically correct).

== Applications ==
Bochner spaces are often used in the functional analysis approach to the study of partial differential equations that depend on time, e.g. the heat equation: if the temperature $g(t, x)$ is a scalar function of time and space, one can write $(f(t))(x) := g(t,x)$ to make $f$ a family $f(t)$ (parametrized by time) of functions of space, possibly in some Bochner space.

=== Application to PDE theory ===
Very often, the space $T$ is an interval of time over which we wish to solve some partial differential equation, and $\mu$ will be one-dimensional Lebesgue measure. The idea is to regard a function of time and space as a collection of functions of space, this collection being parametrized by time. For example, in the solution of the heat equation on a region $\Omega$ in $\R^n$ and an interval of time $[0, T],$ one seeks solutions
$$u \in L^2\left([0, T]; H_0^1(\Omega)\right)$$
with time derivative
$$\frac{\partial u}{\partial t} \in L^2 \left([0, T]; H^{-1}(\Omega)\right).$$
Here $H_0^1(\Omega)$ denotes the Sobolev Hilbert space of once-weakly differentiable functions with first weak derivative in $L^2(\Omega)$ that vanish at the boundary of Ω (in the sense of trace, or, equivalently, are limits of smooth functions with compact support in Ω); $H^{-1} (\Omega)$ denotes the dual space of $H_0^1(\Omega).$

(The "partial derivative" with respect to time $t$ above is actually a total derivative, since the use of Bochner spaces removes the space-dependence.)

== See also ==
- Bochner integral – Concept in mathematics
- Vector measure – Generalization of finite measure to Banach spaces
- Vector-valued functions – Function valued in a vector space; typically a real or complex one
- Weakly measurable function
