= Mary Graustein =

American mathematician and academic (1884-1972)

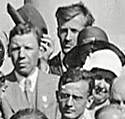
- Left to right, upper: William Caspar Graustein, David Eugene Smith, lower: Franz Rellich, Mary Graustein, at the ICM, Zürich 1932
- Born: Mary Florence Curtis; April 12, 1884; Westminster, Massachusetts
- Died: July 18, 1972 (aged 88); Gardner, Massachusetts
- Burial place: Mount Auburn Cemetery
- Education: Radcliffe College PhD (1917)
- Occupations: mathematician, professor
- Spouse: William Caspar Graustein
- Parents: Frank Abbott Curtis (1857–1937) (father); Jennie Esther Lucas (1857–1945) (mother)

Mary Graustein (April 12, 1884 – July 18, 1972) was a mathematician and university professor, and was the first woman to earn a doctorate in mathematics (1917) at Radcliffe College.

== Life and research ==
Mary Florence Curtis was the oldest of five children born to Jennie Esther (Lucas) (1857–1945) and Frank Abbott Curtis (1857–1937) in Westminster, Massachusetts. She attended Fitchburg High School in Massachusetts and in 1902 she began her undergraduate studies at Wellesley College. She was a Wellesley Honors Scholar throughout her college years and received her Bachelor of Art's degree in 1906.

As was common practice at that time, Mary Curtis took a teaching position at Leominster High School in Westminster, where she taught German, algebra and geometry for two years, traveling to Europe for the summer of 1907.

After her return, from 1908 to 1910, she taught German and natural science at the Cushing Academy in Ashburnham, Massachusetts. (During the summer break of 1909, she studied botany and pedagogy at Cornell University in Ithaca, New York.)

Returning to Germany, Curtis studied mathematics and science for three semesters (May 1910 until August 1911) at Leipzig University.

Upon her return from Leipzig, she joined the Wellesley College mathematics faculty where she taught from September 1911 to June 1914.

Even while she was on the Wellesley faculty, she started graduate school at nearby Radcliffe College in Cambridge, Massachusetts. in September 1913 and was awarded a one-year Mary E. Horton fellowship to facilitate her schooling. Curtis earned her M.A. in 1915 and her Ph.D. in 1917 with a dissertation in differential geometry titled Curves invariant under point transformations of special type. Professors Charles Leonard Bouton and Julian Coolidge were her faculty reviewers. She was the first woman from Harvard-Radcliffe (the two are now combined) to earn a doctorate in math.

=== Professor ===
From 1917 to 1918, Dr. Mary Curtis taught at the College for Women at Case Western Reserve University in Cleveland, Ohio, From 1918 to 1920, she was an instructor and then until 1921 assistant professor at Wellesley College. In the summer of 1920 she returned to Leipzig, Germany. Mary's mathematical research did not go unnoticed. According to mathematician Judy Green:

In a November 1920 letter extracted in the Bulletin of the AMS, the Italian geometer and historian of mathematics Gino Loria wrote to the American historian of mathematics D. E. Smith that 'Mary F. Curtis had established [a] remarkable result, that every rectifiable skew parabola is a helix" (27 (1921): 201). The extract from Loria's letter referred to Curtis's 1918 paper On the rectifiability of a twisted cubic and motivated her 1921 paper On skew parabolas.

It was in Wellesley, on June 10, 1921, at the age of 37, that she married another mathematician William Caspar Graustein (1888–1941), who was born in Cambridge and teaching at Harvard when he met Curtis, one of his students. After their marriage and her subsequent name change, Mary Graustein took an academic leave of absence for two years before returning to teach at Wellesley College as assistant professor. There, from 1923 to 1929, she taught as an assistant professor. From 1926 to 1941, she and her friend and fellow mathematician Rachel Blodgett Adams, Ph.D., worked as tutors at Radcliffe College, work that she enjoyed, as quoted by Green.

My tutorial work at Radcliffe consists of eleven 'tutees.' I see each of them for an hour every other week. Three of them are Seniors; they and their theses on 'Infinite Series,' 'Curve Fitting' and 'The Number System of Algebra' do their bit to keep me busy. I enjoy the work and the girls.

The Grausteins, who had no children, enjoyed travel and made a point of going to Italy every other summer to spend time in the Dolomites until the advent of World War II made such trips inadvisable.

=== Later years ===
Her husband, William Graustein, an assistant dean at Harvard, died in an automobile accident on January 22, 1941, at the age of 52.

After his death, Mary Graustein taught at a series of institutions including Connecticut College, Hunter College in New York City, and Oberlin College in Ohio.

In 1944 she was named assistant professor at Tufts College in Massachusetts. She was promoted to associate professor in 1950 and she remained there until she retired in 1955. After her retirement, she moved into the family home in Westminster and continued to pursue her love of travel.

She died July 18, 1972 at 88 in Gardner, Massachusetts, and was buried in Mount Auburn Cemetery in Cambridge.

== Memberships ==
- American Mathematical Society
- Phi Beta Kappa
- Sigma Xi

== Selected publications ==
- 1918: On the rectifiability of a twisted cubic. In: Bull. Amer. Math. Soc. Volume 25.
- 1918: The existence of the functions of the elliptic cylinder. In: Ann. Of Math. 2nd ser., Volume 20.
- 1920: On the rectifiability of a twisted cubic. In: Bull. Amer. Math. Soc. Volume 26.
- 1921: On skew parabolas. In: Bull. Amer. Math. Soc. Volume 27.
- 1922: Curves invariant under point-transformations of special type. In: Trans. Amer. Math. Soc. Volume 23.
