= Milman–Pettis theorem =

Reflexivity of uniformly convex Banach spaces

In mathematics, the Milman–Pettis theorem states that every uniformly convex Banach space is reflexive.

The theorem was proved independently by D. Milman (1938) and B. J. Pettis (1939). S. Kakutani gave a different proof in 1939, and John R. Ringrose published a shorter proof in 1959.

Mahlon M. Day (1941) gave examples of reflexive Banach spaces which are not isomorphic to any uniformly convex space.
