= Uniformly convex space =

Concept in mathematics of vector spaces

In mathematics, uniformly convex spaces (or uniformly rotund spaces) are common examples of reflexive Banach spaces. The concept of uniform convexity was first introduced by James A. Clarkson in 1936.

== Definition ==
A uniformly convex space is a normed vector space such that, for every $0<\varepsilon \leq 2$ there is some $\delta>0$ such that for any two vectors with $\|x\| = 1$ and $\|y\| = 1,$ the condition

$$\|x-y\|\geq\varepsilon$$

implies that:

$$\left\|\frac{x+y}{2}\right\|\leq 1-\delta.$$

Intuitively, the center of a line segment inside the unit ball must lie deep inside the unit ball unless the segment is short.

== Properties ==
- The unit sphere can be replaced with the closed unit ball in the definition. Namely, a normed vector space $X$ is uniformly convex if and only if for every $0<\varepsilon\le 2$ there is some $\delta>0$ so that, for any two vectors $x$ and $y$ in the closed unit ball (i.e. $\|x\| \le 1$ and $\|y\| \le 1$) with $\|x-y\| \ge \varepsilon$, one has $\left\|{\frac{x+y}{2}}\right\| \le 1-\delta$ (note that, given $\varepsilon$, the corresponding value of $\delta$ could be smaller than the one provided by the original weaker definition).

Proof

The "if" part is trivial. Conversely, assume now that $X$ is uniformly convex and that $x,y$ are as in the statement, for some fixed $0<\varepsilon\le 2$. Let $\delta_1\le 1$ be the value of $\delta$ corresponding to $\frac{\varepsilon}{3}$ in the definition of uniform convexity. We will show that $\left\|\frac{x+y}{2}\right\|\le 1-\delta$, with $\delta=\min\left\{\frac{\varepsilon}{6},\frac{\delta_1}{3}\right\}$.

If $\|x\|\le 1-2\delta$ then $\left\|\frac{x+y}{2}\right\|\le\frac{1}{2}(1-2\delta)+\frac{1}{2}=1-\delta$ and the claim is proved. A similar argument applies for the case $\|y\|\le 1-2\delta$, so we can assume that $1-2\delta<\|x\|,\|y\|\le 1$. In this case, since $\delta\le\frac{1}{3}$, both vectors are nonzero, so we can let $x'=\frac{x}{\|x\|}$ and $y'=\frac{y}{\|y\|}$. We have $\|x'-x\|=1-\|x\|\le 2\delta$ and similarly $\|y'-y\|\le 2\delta$, so $x'$ and $y'$ belong to the unit sphere and have distance $\|x'-y'\|\ge\|x-y\|-4\delta\ge\varepsilon-\frac{4\varepsilon}{6}=\frac{\varepsilon}{3}$. Hence, by our choice of $\delta_1$, we have $\left\|\frac{x'+y'}{2}\right\|\le 1-\delta_1$. It follows that $\left\|\frac{x+y}{2}\right\|\le\left\|\frac{x'+y'}{2}\right\|+\frac{\|x'-x\|+\|y'-y\|}{2}\le 1-\delta_1+2\delta\le 1-\frac{\delta_1}{3}\le 1-\delta$ and the claim is proved.

- The Milman–Pettis theorem states that every uniformly convex Banach space is reflexive, while the converse is not true.
- Every uniformly convex Banach space is a Radon–Riesz space, that is, if $\{f_n\}_{n=1}^{\infty}$ is a sequence in a uniformly convex Banach space that converges weakly to $f$ and satisfies $\|f_n\| \to \|f\|,$ then $f_n$ converges strongly to $f$, that is, $\|f_n - f\| \to 0$.
- A Banach space $X$ is uniformly convex if and only if its dual $X^*$ is uniformly smooth.
- Every uniformly convex space is strictly convex. Intuitively, the strict convexity means a stronger triangle inequality $\|x+y\| < \|x\|+\|y\|$ whenever $x,y$ are linearly independent, while the uniform convexity requires this inequality to be true uniformly.

== Examples ==
- Every inner-product space is uniformly convex.
- Every closed subspace of a uniformly convex Banach space is uniformly convex.
- Clarkson's inequalities imply that L^{p} spaces $(1<p<\infty)$ are uniformly convex.
- Conversely, $L^\infty$ is not uniformly convex.

== See also ==
- Modulus and characteristic of convexity
- Uniformly convex function
- Uniformly smooth space
