= Measure space =

Set on which a generalization of volumes and integrals is defined

A measure space is a basic object of measure theory, a branch of mathematics that studies generalized notions of volumes. It contains an underlying set, the subsets of this set that are feasible for measuring (the σ-algebra), and the method that is used for measuring (the measure). One important example of a measure space is a probability space.

A measurable space consists of the first two components without a specific measure.

== Definition ==
A measure space is a triple $(X, \mathcal A, \mu),$ where

- $X$ is a set
- $\mathcal A$ is a σ-algebra on the set $X$
- $\mu$ is a measure on $(X, \mathcal{A})$

In other words, a measure space consists of a measurable space $(X, \mathcal{A})$ together with a measure on it.

== Example ==
Set $X = \{0, 1\}$. The $\sigma$-algebra on finite sets such as the one above is usually the power set, which is the set of all subsets (of a given set) and is denoted by $\wp(\cdot).$ Sticking with this convention, we set
$$\mathcal{A} = \wp(X)$$

In this simple case, the power set can be written down explicitly:
$$\wp(X) = \{\varnothing, \{0\}, \{1\}, \{0, 1\}\}.$$

As the measure, define $\mu$ by
$$\mu(\{0\}) = \mu(\{1\}) = \frac{1}{2},$$
so $\mu(X) = 1$ (by additivity of measures) and $\mu(\varnothing) = 0$ (by definition of measures).

This leads to the measure space $(X, \wp(X), \mu).$ It is a probability space, since $\mu(X) = 1.$ The measure $\mu$ corresponds to the Bernoulli distribution with $p = \frac{1}{2},$ which is for example used to model a fair coin flip.

== Important classes of measure spaces ==
Most important classes of measure spaces are defined by the properties of their associated measures. This includes, in order of increasing generality:

- Probability spaces, a measure space where the measure is a probability measure
- Finite measure spaces, where the measure is a finite measure
- $\sigma$-finite measure spaces, where the measure is a $\sigma$-finite measure

Another class of measure spaces are the complete measure spaces.
