= Countably barrelled space =

In functional analysis, a topological vector space (TVS) is said to be countably barrelled if every weakly bounded countable union of equicontinuous subsets of its continuous dual space is again equicontinuous. This property is a generalization of barrelled spaces.

== Definition ==
A TVS X with continuous dual space $X^{\prime}$ is said to be countably barrelled if $B^{\prime} \subseteq X^{\prime}$ is a weak-* bounded subset of $X^{\prime}$ that is equal to a countable union of equicontinuous subsets of $X^{\prime}$, then $B^{\prime}$ is itself equicontinuous. A Hausdorff locally convex TVS is countably barrelled if and only if each barrel in X that is equal to the countable intersection of closed convex balanced neighborhoods of 0 is itself a neighborhood of 0.

=== σ-barrelled space ===
A TVS with continuous dual space $X^{\prime}$ is said to be σ-barrelled if every weak-* bounded (countable) sequence in $X^{\prime}$ is equicontinuous.

=== Sequentially barrelled space ===
A TVS with continuous dual space $X^{\prime}$ is said to be sequentially barrelled if every weak-* convergent sequence in $X^{\prime}$ is equicontinuous.

== Properties ==
Every countably barrelled space is a countably quasibarrelled space, a σ-barrelled space, a σ-quasi-barrelled space, and a sequentially barrelled space. An H-space is a TVS whose strong dual space is countably barrelled.

Every countably barrelled space is a σ-barrelled space and every σ-barrelled space is sequentially barrelled. Every σ-barrelled space is a σ-quasi-barrelled space.

A locally convex quasi-barrelled space that is also a 𝜎-barrelled space is a barrelled space.

== Examples and sufficient conditions ==
Every barrelled space is countably barrelled. However, there exist semi-reflexive countably barrelled spaces that are not barrelled. The strong dual of a distinguished space and of a metrizable locally convex space is countably barrelled.

=== Counter-examples ===
There exist σ-barrelled spaces that are not countably barrelled. There exist normed DF-spaces that are not countably barrelled. There exists a quasi-barrelled space that is not a 𝜎-barrelled space. There exist σ-barrelled spaces that are not Mackey spaces. There exist σ-barrelled spaces that are not countably quasi-barrelled spaces and thus not countably barrelled. There exist sequentially barrelled spaces that are not σ-quasi-barrelled. There exist quasi-complete locally convex TVSs that are not sequentially barrelled.

== See also ==
- Barrelled space
- H-space
- Quasibarrelled space
