= Countably quasi-barrelled space =

In functional analysis, a topological vector space (TVS) is said to be countably quasi-barrelled if every strongly bounded countable union of equicontinuous subsets of its continuous dual space is again equicontinuous. This property is a generalization of quasibarrelled spaces.

== Definition ==
A TVS X with continuous dual space $X^{\prime}$ is said to be countably quasi-barrelled if $B^{\prime} \subseteq X^{\prime}$ is a strongly bounded subset of $X^{\prime}$ that is equal to a countable union of equicontinuous subsets of $X^{\prime}$, then $B^{\prime}$ is itself equicontinuous. A Hausdorff locally convex TVS is countably quasi-barrelled if and only if each bornivorous barrel in X that is equal to the countable intersection of closed convex balanced neighborhoods of 0 is itself a neighborhood of 0.

=== σ-quasi-barrelled space ===
A TVS with continuous dual space $X^{\prime}$ is said to be σ-quasi-barrelled if every strongly bounded (countable) sequence in $X^{\prime}$ is equicontinuous.

=== Sequentially quasi-barrelled space ===
A TVS with continuous dual space $X^{\prime}$ is said to be sequentially quasi-barrelled if every strongly convergent sequence in $X^{\prime}$ is equicontinuous.

== Properties ==
Every countably quasi-barrelled space is a σ-quasi-barrelled space.

== Examples and sufficient conditions ==
Every barrelled space, every countably barrelled space, and every quasi-barrelled space is countably quasi-barrelled and thus also σ-quasi-barrelled space. The strong dual of a distinguished space and of a metrizable locally convex space is countably quasi-barrelled.

Every σ-barrelled space is a σ-quasi-barrelled space. Every DF-space is countably quasi-barrelled. A σ-quasi-barrelled space that is sequentially complete is a σ-barrelled space.

There exist σ-barrelled spaces that are not Mackey spaces. There exist σ-barrelled spaces (which are consequently σ-quasi-barrelled spaces) that are not countably quasi-barrelled spaces. There exist sequentially complete Mackey spaces that are not σ-quasi-barrelled. There exist sequentially barrelled spaces that are not σ-quasi-barrelled. There exist quasi-complete locally convex TVSs that are not sequentially barrelled.

== See also ==
- Barrelled space
- Countably barrelled space
- DF-space
- H-space
- Quasibarrelled space
