= Ultrabarrelled space =

In functional analysis and related areas of mathematics, an ultrabarrelled space is a topological vector spaces (TVS) for which every ultrabarrel is a neighbourhood of the origin.

== Definition ==
A subset $B_0$ of a TVS $X$ is called an ultrabarrel if it is a closed and balanced subset of $X$ and if there exists a sequence $\left(B_i\right)_{i=1}^{\infty}$ of closed balanced and absorbing subsets of $X$ such that $B_{i+1} + B_{i+1} \subseteq B_i$ for all $i = 0, 1, \ldots.$ In this case, $\left(B_i\right)_{i=1}^{\infty}$ is called a defining sequence for $B_0.$ A TVS $X$ is called ultrabarrelled if every ultrabarrel in $X$ is a neighbourhood of the origin.

== Properties ==
A locally convex ultrabarrelled space is a barrelled space. Every ultrabarrelled space is a quasi-ultrabarrelled space.

== Examples and sufficient conditions ==
Complete and metrizable TVSs are ultrabarrelled. If $X$ is a complete locally bounded non-locally convex TVS and if $B_0$ is a closed balanced and bounded neighborhood of the origin, then $B_0$ is an ultrabarrel that is not convex and has a defining sequence consisting of non-convex sets.

=== Counter-examples ===
There exist barrelled spaces that are not ultrabarrelled. There exist TVSs that are complete and metrizable (and thus ultrabarrelled) but not barrelled.

== See also ==
- Barrelled space – Type of topological vector space
- Countably barrelled space
- Countably quasi-barrelled space
- Infrabarreled space
- Uniform boundedness principle#Generalisations – Theorem stating that pointwise boundedness implies uniform boundedness

== Bibliography ==
- Bourbaki, Nicolas (1950). "Sur certains espaces vectoriels topologiques". Annales de l'Institut Fourier (in French). 2: 5–16 (1951). doi:10.5802/aif.16. MR 0042609.
- Husain, Taqdir; Khaleelulla, S. M. (1978). Barrelledness in Topological and Ordered Vector Spaces. Lecture Notes in Mathematics. Vol. 692. Berlin, New York, Heidelberg: Springer-Verlag. ISBN 978-3-540-09096-0. OCLC 4493665.
- Jarchow, Hans (1981). Locally convex spaces. Stuttgart: B.G. Teubner. ISBN 978-3-519-02224-4. OCLC 8210342.
- Khaleelulla, S. M. (1982). Counterexamples in Topological Vector Spaces. Lecture Notes in Mathematics. Vol. 936. Berlin, Heidelberg, New York: Springer-Verlag. ISBN 978-3-540-11565-6. OCLC 8588370.
- Narici, Lawrence; Beckenstein, Edward (2011). Topological Vector Spaces. Pure and applied mathematics (Second ed.). Boca Raton, FL: CRC Press. ISBN 978-1584888666. OCLC 144216834.
- Robertson, Alex P.; Robertson, Wendy J. (1964). Topological vector spaces. Cambridge Tracts in Mathematics. Vol. 53. Cambridge University Press. pp. 65–75.
- Schaefer, Helmut H.; Wolff, Manfred P. (1999). Topological Vector Spaces. GTM. Vol. 8 (Second ed.). New York, NY: Springer New York Imprint Springer. ISBN 978-1-4612-7155-0. OCLC 840278135.
- Trèves, François (2006) [1967]. Topological Vector Spaces, Distributions and Kernels. Mineola, N.Y.: Dover Publications. ISBN 978-0-486-45352-1. OCLC 853623322.
