= Metrizable topological vector space =

Topological vector space whose topology can be defined by a metric

In functional analysis and related areas of mathematics, a metrizable (resp. pseudometrizable) topological vector space (TVS) is a TVS whose topology is induced by a metric (resp. pseudometric). An LM-space is an inductive limit of a sequence of locally convex metrizable TVS.

== Pseudometrics and metrics ==
A pseudometric on a set $X$ is a map $d : X \times X \rarr \R$ satisfying the following properties:

1. $d(x, x) = 0 \text{ for all } x \in X$;
2. Symmetry: $d(x, y) = d(y, x) \text{ for all } x, y \in X$;
3. Subadditivity: $d(x, z) \leq d(x, y) + d(y, z) \text{ for all } x, y, z \in X.$

A pseudometric is called a metric if it satisfies:

4. Identity of indiscernibles: for all $x, y \in X,$ if $d(x, y) = 0$ then $x = y.$

Ultrapseudometric

A pseudometric $d$ on $X$ is called a ultrapseudometric or a strong pseudometric if it satisfies:

5. Strong/Ultrametric triangle inequality: $d(x, z) \leq \max \{ d(x, y), d(y, z) \} \text{ for all } x, y, z \in X.$

Pseudometric space

A pseudometric space is a pair $(X, d)$ consisting of a set $X$ and a pseudometric $d$ on $X$ such that $X$'s topology is identical to the topology on $X$ induced by $d.$ We call a pseudometric space $(X, d)$ a metric space (resp. ultrapseudometric space) when $d$ is a metric (resp. ultrapseudometric).

=== Topology induced by a pseudometric ===
If $d$ is a pseudometric on a set $X$ then collection of open balls:
$$B_r(z) := \{ x \in X : d(x, z) < r \}$$
as $z$ ranges over $X$ and $r > 0$ ranges over the positive real numbers, forms a basis for a topology on $X$ that is called the $d$-topology or the pseudometric topology on $X$ induced by $d.$

Convention: If $(X, d)$ is a pseudometric space and $X$ is treated as a topological space, then unless indicated otherwise, it should be assumed that $X$ is endowed with the topology induced by $d.$

Pseudometrizable space

A topological space $(X, \tau)$ is called pseudometrizable (resp. metrizable, ultrapseudometrizable) if there exists a pseudometric (resp. metric, ultrapseudometric) $d$ on $X$ such that $\tau$ is equal to the topology induced by $d.$

== Pseudometrics and values on topological groups ==
An additive topological group is an additive group endowed with a topology, called a group topology, under which addition and negation become continuous operators.

A topology $\tau$ on a real or complex vector space $X$ is called a vector topology or a TVS topology if it makes the operations of vector addition and scalar multiplication continuous (that is, if it makes $X$ into a topological vector space).

Every topological vector space (TVS) $X$ is an additive commutative topological group but not all group topologies on $X$ are vector topologies. This is because despite it making addition and negation continuous, a group topology on a vector space $X$ may fail to make scalar multiplication continuous. For instance, the discrete topology on any non-trivial vector space makes addition and negation continuous but do not make scalar multiplication continuous.

=== Translation invariant pseudometrics ===
If $X$ is an additive group then we say that a pseudometric $d$ on $X$ is translation invariant or just invariant if it satisfies any of the following equivalent conditions:

1. Translation invariance: $d(x + z, y + z) = d(x, y) \text{ for all } x, y, z \in X$;
2. $d(x, y) = d(x - y, 0) \text{ for all } x, y \in X.$

=== Value/G-seminorm ===
If $X$ is a topological group the a value or G-seminorm on $X$ (the G stands for Group) is a real-valued map $p : X \rarr \R$ with the following properties:

1. Non-negative: $p \geq 0.$
2. Subadditive: $p(x + y) \leq p(x) + p(y) \text{ for all } x, y \in X$;
3. $p(0) = 0..$
4. Symmetric: $p(-x) = p(x) \text{ for all } x \in X.$

where we call a G-seminorm a G-norm if it satisfies the additional condition:

5. Total/Positive definite: If $p(x) = 0$ then $x = 0.$

==== Properties of values ====
If $p$ is a value on a vector space $X$ then:

- $|p(x) - p(y)| \leq p(x - y) \text{ for all } x, y \in X.$
- $p(n x) \leq n p(x)$ and $\frac{1}{n} p(x) \leq p(x / n)$ for all $x \in X$ and positive integers $n.$
- The set $\{ x \in X : p(x) = 0 \}$ is an additive subgroup of $X.$

=== Equivalence on topological groups ===
Theorem—Suppose that $X$ is an additive commutative group. If $d$ is a translation invariant pseudometric on $X$ then the map $p(x) := d(x, 0)$ is a value on $X$ called the value associated with $d$, and moreover, $d$ generates a group topology on $X$ (i.e. the $d$-topology on $X$ makes $X$ into a topological group). Conversely, if $p$ is a value on $X$ then the map $d(x, y) := p(x - y)$ is a translation-invariant pseudometric on $X$ and the value associated with $d$ is just $p.$

=== Pseudometrizable topological groups ===
Theorem—If $(X, \tau)$ is an additive commutative topological group then the following are equivalent:

1. $\tau$ is induced by a pseudometric; (i.e. $(X, \tau)$ is pseudometrizable);
2. $\tau$ is induced by a translation-invariant pseudometric;
3. the identity element in $(X, \tau)$ has a countable neighborhood basis.

If $(X, \tau)$ is Hausdorff then the word "pseudometric" in the above statement may be replaced by the word "metric." A commutative topological group is metrizable if and only if it is Hausdorff and pseudometrizable.

=== An invariant pseudometric that doesn't induce a vector topology ===
Let $X$ be a non-trivial (i.e. $X \neq \{ 0 \}$) real or complex vector space and let $d$ be the translation-invariant trivial metric on $X$ defined by $d(x, x) = 0$ and $d(x, y) = 1 \text{ for all } x, y \in X$ such that $x \neq y.$ The topology $\tau$ that $d$ induces on $X$ is the discrete topology, which makes $(X, \tau)$ into a commutative topological group under addition but does not form a vector topology on $X$ because $(X, \tau)$ is disconnected but every vector topology is connected. What fails is that scalar multiplication isn't continuous on $(X, \tau).$

This example shows that a translation-invariant (pseudo)metric is not enough to guarantee a vector topology, which leads us to define paranorms and F-seminorms.

== Additive sequences ==
A collection $\mathcal{N}$ of subsets of a vector space is called additive if for every $N \in \mathcal{N},$ there exists some $U \in \mathcal{N}$ such that $U + U \subseteq N.$

Continuity of addition at 0—If $(X, +)$ is a group (as all vector spaces are), $\tau$ is a topology on $X,$ and $X \times X$ is endowed with the product topology, then the addition map $X \times X \to X$ (i.e. the map $(x, y) \mapsto x + y$) is continuous at the origin of $X \times X$ if and only if the set of neighborhoods of the origin in $(X, \tau)$ is additive. This statement remains true if the word "neighborhood" is replaced by "open neighborhood."

All of the above conditions are consequently a necessary for a topology to form a vector topology. Additive sequences of sets have the particularly nice property that they define non-negative continuous real-valued subadditive functions. These functions can then be used to prove many of the basic properties of topological vector spaces and also show that a Hausdorff TVS with a countable basis of neighborhoods is metrizable. The following theorem is true more generally for commutative additive topological groups.

Theorem—Let $U_{\bull} = \left(U_i\right)_{i=0}^{\infty}$ be a collection of subsets of a vector space such that $0 \in U_i$ and $U_{i+1} + U_{i+1} \subseteq U_i$ for all $i \geq 0.$ For all $u \in U_0,$ let
$$\mathbb{S}(u) := \left\{ n_{\bull} = \left(n_1, \ldots, n_k\right) ~:~ k \geq 1, n_i \geq 0 \text{ for all } i, \text{ and } u \in U_{n_1} + \cdots + U_{n_k}\right\}.$$

Define $f : X \to [0, 1]$ by $f(x) = 1$ if $x \not\in U_0$ and otherwise let
$$f(x) := \inf_{} \left\{ 2^{- n_1} + \cdots 2^{- n_k} ~:~ n_{\bull} = \left(n_1, \ldots, n_k\right) \in \mathbb{S}(x)\right\}.$$

Then $f$ is subadditive (meaning $f(x + y) \leq f(x) + f(y) \text{ for all } x, y \in X$) and $f = 0$ on $\bigcap_{i \geq 0} U_i,$ so in particular $f(0) = 0.$ If all $U_i$ are symmetric sets then $f(-x) = f(x)$ and if all $U_i$ are balanced then $f(s x) \leq f(x)$ for all scalars $s$ such that $|s| \leq 1$ and all $x \in X.$ If $X$ is a topological vector space and if all $U_i$ are neighborhoods of the origin then $f$ is continuous, where if in addition $X$ is Hausdorff and $U_{\bull}$ forms a basis of balanced neighborhoods of the origin in $X$ then $d(x, y) := f(x - y)$ is a metric defining the vector topology on $X.$

Proof

Assume that $n_{\bull} = \left(n_1, \ldots, n_k\right)$ always denotes a finite sequence of non-negative integers and use the notation:
$$\sum 2^{- n_{\bull}} := 2^{- n_1} + \cdots + 2^{- n_k} \quad \text{ and } \quad \sum U_{n_{\bull}} := U_{n_1} + \cdots + U_{n_k}.$$

For any integers $n \geq 0$ and $d > 2,$
$$U_n \supseteq U_{n+1} + U_{n+1} \supseteq U_{n+1} + U_{n+2} + U_{n+2} \supseteq U_{n+1} + U_{n+2} + \cdots + U_{n+d} + U_{n+d+1} + U_{n+d+1}.$$

From this it follows that if $n_{\bull} = \left(n_1, \ldots, n_k\right)$ consists of distinct positive integers then $\sum U_{n_{\bull}} \subseteq U_{-1 + \min \left(n_{\bull}\right)}.$

It will now be shown by induction on $k$ that if $n_{\bull} = \left(n_1, \ldots, n_k\right)$ consists of non-negative integers such that $\sum 2^{- n_{\bull}} \leq 2^{- M}$ for some integer $M \geq 0$ then $\sum U_{n_{\bull}} \subseteq U_M.$ This is clearly true for $k = 1$ and $k = 2$ so assume that $k > 2,$ which implies that all $n_i$ are positive. If all $n_i$ are distinct then this step is done, and otherwise pick distinct indices $i < j$ such that $n_i = n_j$ and construct $m_{\bull} = \left(m_1, \ldots, m_{k-1}\right)$ from $n_{\bull}$ by replacing each $n_i$ with $n_i - 1$ and deleting the $j^{\text{th}}$ element of $n_{\bull}$ (all other elements of $n_{\bull}$ are transferred to $m_{\bull}$ unchanged). Observe that $\sum 2^{- n_{\bull}} = \sum 2^{- m_{\bull}}$ and $\sum U_{n_{\bull}} \subseteq \sum U_{m_{\bull}}$ (because $U_{n_i} + U_{n_j} \subseteq U_{n_i - 1}$) so by appealing to the inductive hypothesis we conclude that $\sum U_{n_{\bull}} \subseteq \sum U_{m_{\bull}} \subseteq U_M,$ as desired.

It is clear that $f(0) = 0$ and that $0 \leq f \leq 1$ so to prove that $f$ is subadditive, it suffices to prove that $f(x + y) \leq f(x) + f(y)$ when $x, y \in X$ are such that $f(x) + f(y) < 1,$ which implies that $x, y \in U_0.$ This is an exercise. If all $U_i$ are symmetric then $x \in \sum U_{n_{\bull}}$ if and only if $- x \in \sum U_{n_{\bull}}$ from which it follows that $f(-x) \leq f(x)$ and $f(-x) \geq f(x).$ If all $U_i$ are balanced then the inequality $f(s x) \leq f(x)$ for all unit scalars $s$ such that $|s| \leq 1$ is proved similarly. Because $f$ is a nonnegative subadditive function satisfying $f(0) = 0,$ as described in the article on sublinear functionals, $f$ is uniformly continuous on $X$ if and only if $f$ is continuous at the origin. If all $U_i$ are neighborhoods of the origin then for any real $r > 0,$ pick an integer $M > 1$ such that $2^{-M} < r$ so that $x \in U_M$ implies $f(x) \leq 2^{-M} < r.$ If the set of all $U_i$ form basis of balanced neighborhoods of the origin then it may be shown that for any $n > 1,$ there exists some $0 < r \leq 2^{-n}$ such that $f(x) < r$ implies $x \in U_n.$ $\blacksquare$

== Paranorms ==
If $X$ is a vector space over the real or complex numbers then a paranorm on $X$ is a G-seminorm (defined above) $p : X \rarr \R$ on $X$ that satisfies any of the following additional conditions, each of which begins with "for all sequences $x_{\bull} = \left(x_i\right)_{i=1}^{\infty}$ in $X$ and all convergent sequences of scalars $s_{\bull} = \left(s_i\right)_{i=1}^{\infty}$":

1. Continuity of multiplication: if $s$ is a scalar and $x \in X$ are such that $p\left(x_i - x\right) \to 0$ and $s_{\bull} \to s,$ then $p\left(s_i x_i - s x\right) \to 0.$
2. Both of the conditions:
  - if $s_{\bull} \to 0$ and if $x \in X$ is such that $p\left(x_i - x\right) \to 0$ then $p\left(s_i x_i\right) \to 0$;
  - if $p\left(x_{\bull}\right) \to 0$ then $p\left(s x_i\right) \to 0$ for every scalar $s.$
3. Both of the conditions:
  - if $p\left(x_{\bull}\right) \to 0$ and $s_{\bull} \to s$ for some scalar $s$ then $p\left(s_i x_i\right) \to 0$;
  - if $s_{\bull} \to 0$ then $p\left(s_i x\right) \to 0 \text{ for all } x \in X.$
4. Separate continuity:
  - if $s_{\bull} \to s$ for some scalar $s$ then $p\left(s x_i - s x\right) \to 0$ for every $x \in X$;
  - if $s$ is a scalar, $x \in X,$ and $p\left(x_i - x\right) \to 0$ then $p\left(s x_i - s x\right) \to 0$ .

A paranorm is called total if in addition it satisfies:

- Total/Positive definite: $p(x) = 0$ implies $x = 0.$

=== Properties of paranorms ===
If $p$ is a paranorm on a vector space $X$ then the map $d : X \times X \rarr \R$ defined by $d(x, y) := p(x - y)$ is a translation-invariant pseudometric on $X$ that defines a vector topology on $X.$

If $p$ is a paranorm on a vector space $X$ then:

- the set $\{ x \in X : p(x) = 0 \}$ is a vector subspace of $X.$
- $p(x + n) = p(x) \text{ for all } x, n \in X$ with $p(n) = 0.$
- If a paranorm $p$ satisfies $p(s x) \leq |s| p(x) \text{ for all } x \in X$ and scalars $s,$ then $p$ is absolutely homogeneity (i.e. equality holds) and thus $p$ is a seminorm.

=== Examples of paranorms ===
- If $d$ is a translation-invariant pseudometric on a vector space $X$ that induces a vector topology $\tau$ on $X$ (i.e. $(X, \tau)$ is a TVS) then the map $p(x) := d(x - y, 0)$ defines a continuous paranorm on $(X, \tau)$; moreover, the topology that this paranorm $p$ defines in $X$ is $\tau.$
- If $p$ is a paranorm on $X$ then so is the map $q(x) := p(x) / [1 + p(x)].$
- Every positive scalar multiple of a paranorm (resp. total paranorm) is again such a paranorm (resp. total paranorm).
- Every seminorm is a paranorm.
- The restriction of an paranorm (resp. total paranorm) to a vector subspace is an paranorm (resp. total paranorm).
- The sum of two paranorms is a paranorm.
- If $p$ and $q$ are paranorms on $X$ then so is $(p \wedge q)(x) := \inf_{} \{ p(y) + q(z) : x = y + z \text{ with } y, z \in X \}.$ Moreover, $(p \wedge q) \leq p$ and $(p \wedge q) \leq q.$ This makes the set of paranorms on $X$ into a conditionally complete lattice.
- Each of the following real-valued maps are paranorms on $X := \R^2$:
  - $(x, y) \mapsto |x|$
  - $(x, y) \mapsto |x| + |y|$
- The real-valued maps $(x, y) \mapsto \sqrt{\left|x^2 - y^2\right|}$ and $(x, y) \mapsto \left|x^2 - y^2\right|^{3/2}$ are not paranorms on $X := \R^2.$
- If $x_{\bull} = \left(x_i\right)_{i \in I}$ is a Hamel basis on a vector space $X$ then the real-valued map that sends $x = \sum_{i \in I} s_i x_i \in X$ (where all but finitely many of the scalars $s_i$ are 0) to $\sum_{i \in I} \sqrt{\left|s_i\right|}$ is a paranorm on $X,$ which satisfies $p(sx) = \sqrt{|s|} p(x)$ for all $x \in X$ and scalars $s.$
- The function $p(x) := |\sin (\pi x)| + \min \{ 2, |x| \}$ is a paranorm on $\R$ that is not balanced but nevertheless equivalent to the usual norm on $R.$ Note that the function $x \mapsto |\sin (\pi x)|$ is subadditive.
- Let $X_{\Complex}$ be a complex vector space and let $X_{\R}$ denote $X_{\Complex}$ considered as a vector space over $\R.$ Any paranorm on $X_{\Complex}$ is also a paranorm on $X_{\R}.$

== F-seminorms ==
If $X$ is a vector space over the real or complex numbers then an F-seminorm on $X$ (the $F$ stands for Fréchet) is a real-valued map $p : X \to \Reals$ with the following four properties:

1. Non-negative: $p \geq 0.$
2. Subadditive: $p(x + y) \leq p(x) + p(y)$ for all $x, y \in X$
3. Balanced: $p(a x) \leq p(x)$ for $x \in X$ all scalars $a$ satisfying $|a| \leq 1;$
  - This condition guarantees that each set of the form $\{z \in X : p(z) \leq r\}$ or $\{z \in X : p(z) < r\}$ for some $r \geq 0$ is a balanced set.
4. For every $x \in X,$ $p\left(\tfrac{1}{n} x\right) \to 0$ as $n \to \infty$
  - The sequence $\left(\tfrac{1}{n}\right)_{n=1}^\infty$ can be replaced by any positive sequence converging to the zero.

An F-seminorm is called an F-norm if in addition it satisfies:

5. Total/Positive definite: $p(x) = 0$ implies $x = 0.$

An F-seminorm is called monotone if it satisfies:

6. Monotone: $p(r x) < p(s x)$ for all non-zero $x \in X$ and all real $s$ and $t$ such that $s < t.$

=== F-seminormed spaces ===
An F-seminormed space (resp. F-normed space) is a pair $(X, p)$ consisting of a vector space $X$ and an F-seminorm (resp. F-norm) $p$ on $X.$

If $(X, p)$ and $(Z, q)$ are F-seminormed spaces then a map $f : X \to Z$ is called an isometric embedding if $q(f(x) - f(y)) = p(x, y) \text{ for all } x, y \in X.$

Every isometric embedding of one F-seminormed space into another is a topological embedding, but the converse is not true in general.

=== Examples of F-seminorms ===
- Every positive scalar multiple of an F-seminorm (resp. F-norm, seminorm) is again an F-seminorm (resp. F-norm, seminorm).
- The sum of finitely many F-seminorms (resp. F-norms) is an F-seminorm (resp. F-norm).
- If $p$ and $q$ are F-seminorms on $X$ then so is their pointwise supremum $x \mapsto \sup \{p(x), q(x)\}.$ The same is true of the supremum of any non-empty finite family of F-seminorms on $X.$
- The restriction of an F-seminorm (resp. F-norm) to a vector subspace is an F-seminorm (resp. F-norm).
- A non-negative real-valued function on $X$ is a seminorm if and only if it is a convex F-seminorm, or equivalently, if and only if it is a convex balanced G-seminorm. In particular, every seminorm is an F-seminorm.
- For any $0 < p < 1,$ the map $f$ on $\Reals^n$ defined by
  $$[f\left(x_1, \ldots, x_n\right)]^p = \left|x_1\right|^p + \cdots \left|x_n\right|^p$$
  is an F-norm that is not a norm.
- If $L : X \to Y$ is a linear map and if $q$ is an F-seminorm on $Y,$ then $q \circ L$ is an F-seminorm on $X.$
- Let $X_\Complex$ be a complex vector space and let $X_\Reals$ denote $X_\Complex$ considered as a vector space over $\Reals.$ Any F-seminorm on $X_\Complex$ is also an F-seminorm on $X_\Reals.$

=== Properties of F-seminorms ===
Every F-seminorm is a paranorm and every paranorm is equivalent to some F-seminorm. Every F-seminorm on a vector space $X$ is a value on $X.$ In particular, $p(x) = 0,$ and $p(x) = p(-x)$ for all $x \in X.$

=== Topology induced by a single F-seminorm ===
Theorem—Let $p$ be an F-seminorm on a vector space $X.$ Then the map $d : X \times X \to \Reals$ defined by $d(x, y) := p(x - y)$ is a translation invariant pseudometric on $X$ that defines a vector topology $\tau$ on $X.$ If $p$ is an F-norm then $d$ is a metric. When $X$ is endowed with this topology then $p$ is a continuous map on $X.$

The balanced sets $\{x \in X ~:~ p(x) \leq r\},$ as $r$ ranges over the positive reals, form a neighborhood basis at the origin for this topology consisting of closed set. Similarly, the balanced sets $\{x \in X ~:~ p(x) < r\},$ as $r$ ranges over the positive reals, form a neighborhood basis at the origin for this topology consisting of open sets.

=== Topology induced by a family of F-seminorms ===
Suppose that $\mathcal{L}$ is a non-empty collection of F-seminorms on a vector space $X$ and for any finite subset $\mathcal{F} \subseteq \mathcal{L}$ and any $r > 0,$ let
$$U_{\mathcal{F}, r} := \bigcap_{p \in \mathcal{F}} \{x \in X : p(x) < r\}.$$

The set $\left\{U_{\mathcal{F}, r} ~:~ r > 0, \mathcal{F} \subseteq \mathcal{L}, \mathcal{F} \text{ finite }\right\}$ forms a filter base on $X$ that also forms a neighborhood basis at the origin for a vector topology on $X$ denoted by $\tau_{\mathcal{L}}.$ Each $U_{\mathcal{F}, r}$ is a balanced and absorbing subset of $X.$ These sets satisfy
$$U_{\mathcal{F}, r/2} + U_{\mathcal{F}, r/2} \subseteq U_{\mathcal{F}, r}.$$

- $\tau_{\mathcal{L}}$ is the coarsest vector topology on $X$ making each $p \in \mathcal{L}$ continuous.
- $\tau_{\mathcal{L}}$ is Hausdorff if and only if for every non-zero $x \in X,$ there exists some $p \in \mathcal{L}$ such that $p(x) > 0.$
- If $\mathcal{F}$ is the set of all continuous F-seminorms on $\left(X, \tau_{\mathcal{L}}\right)$ then $\tau_{\mathcal{L}} = \tau_{\mathcal{F}}.$
- If $\mathcal{F}$ is the set of all pointwise suprema of non-empty finite subsets of $\mathcal{F}$ of $\mathcal{L}$ then $\mathcal{F}$ is a directed family of F-seminorms and $\tau_{\mathcal{L}} = \tau_{\mathcal{F}}.$

== Fréchet combination ==
Suppose that $p_{\bull} = \left(p_i\right)_{i=1}^{\infty}$ is a family of non-negative subadditive functions on a vector space $X.$

The Fréchet combination of $p_{\bull}$ is defined to be the real-valued map
$$p(x) := \sum_{i=1}^{\infty} \frac{p_i(x)}{2^{i} \left[ 1 + p_i(x)\right]}.$$

=== As an F-seminorm ===
Assume that $p_{\bull} = \left(p_i\right)_{i=1}^{\infty}$ is an increasing sequence of seminorms on $X$ and let $p$ be the Fréchet combination of $p_{\bull}.$ Then $p$ is an F-seminorm on $X$ that induces the same locally convex topology as the family $p_{\bull}$ of seminorms.

Since $p_{\bull} = \left(p_i\right)_{i=1}^{\infty}$ is increasing, a basis of open neighborhoods of the origin consists of all sets of the form $\left\{ x \in X ~:~ p_i(x) < r\right\}$ as $i$ ranges over all positive integers and $r > 0$ ranges over all positive real numbers.

The translation invariant pseudometric on $X$ induced by this F-seminorm $p$ is
$$d(x, y) = \sum^{\infty}_{i=1} \frac{1}{2^i} \frac{p_i( x - y )}{1 + p_i( x - y )}.$$

This metric was discovered by Fréchet in his 1906 thesis for the spaces of real and complex sequences with pointwise operations.

=== As a paranorm ===
If each $p_i$ is a paranorm then so is $p$ and moreover, $p$ induces the same topology on $X$ as the family $p_{\bull}$ of paranorms. This is also true of the following paranorms on $X$:

- $q(x) := \inf_{} \left\{ \sum_{i=1}^n p_i(x) + \frac{1}{n} ~:~ n > 0 \text{ is an integer }\right\}.$
- $r(x) := \sum_{n=1}^{\infty} \min \left\{ \frac{1}{2^n}, p_n(x)\right\}.$

=== Generalization ===
The Fréchet combination can be generalized by use of a bounded remetrization function.

A bounded remetrization function is a continuous non-negative non-decreasing map $R : [0, \infty) \to [0, \infty)$ that has a bounded range, is subadditive (meaning that $R(s + t) \leq R(s) + R(t)$ for all $s, t \geq 0$), and satisfies $R(s) = 0$ if and only if $s = 0.$

Examples of bounded remetrization functions include $\arctan t,$ $\tanh t,$ $t \mapsto \min \{t, 1\},$ and $t \mapsto \frac{t}{1 + t}.$ If $d$ is a pseudometric (respectively, metric) on $X$ and $R$ is a bounded remetrization function then $R \circ d$ is a bounded pseudometric (respectively, bounded metric) on $X$ that is uniformly equivalent to $d.$

Suppose that $p_\bull = \left(p_i\right)_{i=1}^\infty$ is a family of non-negative F-seminorm on a vector space $X,$ $R$ is a bounded remetrization function, and $r_\bull = \left(r_i\right)_{i=1}^\infty$ is a sequence of positive real numbers whose sum is finite. Then
$$p(x) := \sum_{i=1}^\infty r_i R\left(p_i(x)\right)$$
defines a bounded F-seminorm that is uniformly equivalent to the $p_\bull.$ It has the property that for any net $x_\bull = \left(x_a\right)_{a \in A}$ in $X,$ $p\left(x_\bull\right) \to 0$ if and only if $p_i\left(x_\bull\right) \to 0$ for all $i.$ $p$ is an F-norm if and only if the $p_\bull$ separate points on $X.$

== Characterizations ==
=== Of (pseudo)metrics induced by (semi)norms ===
A pseudometric (resp. metric) $d$ is induced by a seminorm (resp. norm) on a vector space $X$ if and only if $d$ is translation invariant and absolutely homogeneous, which means that for all scalars $s$ and all $x, y \in X,$ in which case the function defined by $p(x) := d(x, 0)$ is a seminorm (resp. norm) and the pseudometric (resp. metric) induced by $p$ is equal to $d.$

=== Of pseudometrizable TVS ===
If $(X, \tau)$ is a topological vector space (TVS) (where note in particular that $\tau$ is assumed to be a vector topology) then the following are equivalent:

1. $X$ is pseudometrizable (i.e. the vector topology $\tau$ is induced by a pseudometric on $X$).
2. $X$ has a countable neighborhood base at the origin.
3. The topology on $X$ is induced by a translation-invariant pseudometric on $X.$
4. The topology on $X$ is induced by an F-seminorm.
5. The topology on $X$ is induced by a paranorm.

=== Of metrizable TVS ===
If $(X, \tau)$ is a TVS then the following are equivalent:

1. $X$ is metrizable.
2. $X$ is Hausdorff and pseudometrizable.
3. $X$ is Hausdorff and has a countable neighborhood base at the origin.
4. The topology on $X$ is induced by a translation-invariant metric on $X.$
5. The topology on $X$ is induced by an F-norm.
6. The topology on $X$ is induced by a monotone F-norm.
7. The topology on $X$ is induced by a total paranorm.

Birkhoff–Kakutani theorem—If $(X, \tau)$ is a topological vector space then the following three conditions are equivalent: (Note: In fact, this is true for topological group, for the proof doesn't use the scalar multiplications.)

1. The origin $\{ 0 \}$ is closed in $X,$ and there is a countable basis of neighborhoods for $0$ in $X.$
2. $(X, \tau)$ is metrizable (as a topological space).
3. There is a translation-invariant metric on $X$ that induces on $X$ the topology $\tau,$ which is the given topology on $X.$

By the Birkhoff–Kakutani theorem, it follows that there is an equivalent metric that is translation-invariant.

=== Of locally convex pseudometrizable TVS ===
If $(X, \tau)$ is TVS then the following are equivalent:

1. $X$ is locally convex and pseudometrizable.
2. $X$ has a countable neighborhood base at the origin consisting of convex sets.
3. The topology of $X$ is induced by a countable family of (continuous) seminorms.
4. The topology of $X$ is induced by a countable increasing sequence of (continuous) seminorms $\left(p_i\right)_{i=1}^{\infty}$ (increasing means that for all $i,$ $p_i \geq p_{i+1}.$
5. The topology of $X$ is induced by an F-seminorm of the form:
  $$p(x) = \sum_{n=1}^{\infty} 2^{-n} \operatorname{arctan} p_n(x)$$
  where $\left(p_i\right)_{i=1}^{\infty}$ are (continuous) seminorms on $X.$

== Quotients ==
Let $M$ be a vector subspace of a topological vector space $(X, \tau).$

- If $X$ is a pseudometrizable TVS then so is $X / M.$
- If $X$ is a complete pseudometrizable TVS and $M$ is a closed vector subspace of $X$ then $X / M$ is complete.
- If $X$ is metrizable TVS and $M$ is a closed vector subspace of $X$ then $X / M$ is metrizable.
- If $p$ is an F-seminorm on $X,$ then the map $P : X / M \to \R$ defined by
  $$P(x + M) := \inf_{} \{ p(x + m) : m \in M \}$$
  is an F-seminorm on $X / M$ that induces the usual quotient topology on $X / M.$ If in addition $p$ is an F-norm on $X$ and if $M$ is a closed vector subspace of $X$ then $P$ is an F-norm on $X.$

== Examples and sufficient conditions ==
- Every seminormed space $(X, p)$ is pseudometrizable with a canonical pseudometric given by $d(x, y) := p(x - y)$ for all $x, y \in X.$.
- If $(X, d)$ is pseudometric TVS with a translation invariant pseudometric $d,$ then $p(x) := d(x, 0)$ defines a paranorm. However, if $d$ is a translation invariant pseudometric on the vector space $X$ (without the addition condition that $(X, d)$ is pseudometric TVS), then $d$ need not be either an F-seminorm nor a paranorm.
- If a TVS has a bounded neighborhood of the origin then it is pseudometrizable; the converse is in general false.
- If a Hausdorff TVS has a bounded neighborhood of the origin then it is metrizable.
- Suppose $X$ is either a DF-space or an LM-space. If $X$ is a sequential space then it is either metrizable or else a Montel DF-space.

If $X$ is Hausdorff locally convex TVS then $X$ with the strong topology, $\left(X, b\left(X, X^{\prime}\right)\right),$ is metrizable if and only if there exists a countable set $\mathcal{B}$ of bounded subsets of $X$ such that every bounded subset of $X$ is contained in some element of $\mathcal{B}.$

The strong dual space $X_b^{\prime}$ of a metrizable locally convex space (such as a Fréchet space) $X$ is a DF-space. The strong dual of a DF-space is a Fréchet space. The strong dual of a reflexive Fréchet space is a bornological space. The strong bidual (that is, the strong dual space of the strong dual space) of a metrizable locally convex space is a Fréchet space. If $X$ is a metrizable locally convex space then its strong dual $X_b^{\prime}$ has one of the following properties, if and only if it has all of these properties: (1) bornological, (2) infrabarreled, (3) barreled.

=== Normability ===
A topological vector space is seminormable if and only if it has a convex bounded neighborhood of the origin. Moreover, a TVS is normable if and only if it is Hausdorff and seminormable. Every metrizable TVS on a finite-dimensional vector space is a normable locally convex complete TVS, being TVS-isomorphic to Euclidean space. Consequently, any metrizable TVS that is not normable must be infinite dimensional.

If $M$ is a metrizable locally convex TVS that possess a countable fundamental system of bounded sets, then $M$ is normable.

If $X$ is a Hausdorff locally convex space then the following are equivalent:

1. $X$ is normable.
2. $X$ has a (von Neumann) bounded neighborhood of the origin.
3. the strong dual space $X^{\prime}_b$ of $X$ is normable.

and if this locally convex space $X$ is also metrizable, then the following may be appended to this list:

4. the strong dual space of $X$ is metrizable.
5. the strong dual space of $X$ is a Fréchet–Urysohn locally convex space.

In particular, if a metrizable locally convex space $X$ (such as a Fréchet space) is not normable then its strong dual space $X^{\prime}_b$ is not a Fréchet–Urysohn space and consequently, this complete Hausdorff locally convex space $X^{\prime}_b$ is also neither metrizable nor normable.

Another consequence of this is that if $X$ is a reflexive locally convex TVS whose strong dual $X^{\prime}_b$ is metrizable then $X^{\prime}_b$ is necessarily a reflexive Fréchet space, $X$ is a DF-space, both $X$ and $X^{\prime}_b$ are necessarily complete Hausdorff ultrabornological distinguished webbed spaces, and moreover, $X^{\prime}_b$ is normable if and only if $X$ is normable if and only if $X$ is Fréchet–Urysohn if and only if $X$ is metrizable. In particular, such a space $X$ is either a Banach space or else it is not even a Fréchet–Urysohn space.

== Metrically bounded sets and bounded sets ==
Suppose that $(X, d)$ is a pseudometric space and $B \subseteq X.$ The set $B$ is metrically bounded or $d$-bounded if there exists a real number $R > 0$ such that $d(x, y) \leq R$ for all $x, y \in B$; the smallest such $R$ is then called the diameter or $d$-diameter of $B.$ If $B$ is bounded in a pseudometrizable TVS $X$ then it is metrically bounded; the converse is in general false but it is true for locally convex metrizable TVSs.

== Properties of pseudometrizable TVS ==
Theorem—All infinite-dimensional separable complete metrizable TVS are homeomorphic.

- Every metrizable locally convex TVS is a quasibarrelled space, bornological space, and a Mackey space.
- Every complete pseudometrizable TVS is a barrelled space and a Baire space (and hence non-meager). However, there exist metrizable Baire spaces that are not complete.
- If $X$ is a metrizable locally convex space, then the strong dual of $X$ is bornological if and only if it is barreled, if and only if it is infrabarreled.
- If $X$ is a complete pseudometrizable TVS and $M$ is a closed vector subspace of $X,$ then $X / M$ is complete.
- The strong dual of a locally convex metrizable TVS is a webbed space.
- If $(X, \tau)$ and $(X, \nu)$ are complete metrizable TVSs (i.e. F-spaces) and if $\nu$ is coarser than $\tau$ then $\tau = \nu$; this is no longer guaranteed to be true if any one of these metrizable TVSs is not complete. Said differently, if $(X, \tau)$ and $(X, \nu)$ are both F-spaces but with different topologies, then neither one of $\tau$ and $\nu$ contains the other as a subset. One particular consequence of this is, for example, that if $(X, p)$ is a Banach space and $(X, q)$ is some other normed space whose norm-induced topology is finer than (or alternatively, is coarser than) that of $(X, p)$ (i.e. if $p \leq C q$ or if $q \leq C p$ for some constant $C > 0$), then the only way that $(X, q)$ can be a Banach space (i.e. also be complete) is if these two norms $p$ and $q$ are equivalent; if they are not equivalent, then $(X, q)$ can not be a Banach space. As another consequence, if $(X, p)$ is a Banach space and $(X, \nu)$ is a Fréchet space, then the map $p : (X, \nu) \to \R$ is continuous if and only if the Fréchet space $(X, \nu)$ is the TVS $(X, p)$ (here, the Banach space $(X, p)$ is being considered as a TVS, which means that its norm is "forgetten" but its topology is remembered).
- A metrizable locally convex space is normable if and only if its strong dual space is a Fréchet–Urysohn locally convex space.
- Any product of complete metrizable TVSs is a Baire space.
- A product of metrizable TVSs is metrizable if and only if it all but at most countably many of these TVSs have dimension $0.$
- A product of pseudometrizable TVSs is pseudometrizable if and only if it all but at most countably many of these TVSs have the trivial topology.
- Every complete pseudometrizable TVS is a barrelled space and a Baire space (and thus non-meager).
- The dimension of a complete metrizable TVS is either finite or uncountable.

=== Completeness ===
Every topological vector space (and more generally, a topological group) has a canonical uniform structure, induced by its topology, which allows the notions of completeness and uniform continuity to be applied to it. If $X$ is a metrizable TVS and $d$ is a metric that defines $X$'s topology, then its possible that $X$ is complete as a TVS (i.e. relative to its uniformity) but the metric $d$ is not a complete metric (such metrics exist even for $X = \R$). Thus, if $X$ is a TVS whose topology is induced by a pseudometric $d,$ then the notion of completeness of $X$ (as a TVS) and the notion of completeness of the pseudometric space $(X, d)$ are not always equivalent. The next theorem gives a condition for when they are equivalent:

Theorem—If $X$ is a pseudometrizable TVS whose topology is induced by a translation invariant pseudometric $d,$ then $d$ is a complete pseudometric on $X$ if and only if $X$ is complete as a TVS.

Theorem (Klee)—Let $d$ be any (Note: Not assumed to be translation-invariant.) metric on a vector space $X$ such that the topology $\tau$ induced by $d$ on $X$ makes $(X, \tau)$ into a topological vector space. If $(X, d)$ is a complete metric space then $(X, \tau)$ is a complete-TVS.

Theorem—If $X$ is a TVS whose topology is induced by a paranorm $p,$ then $X$ is complete if and only if for every sequence $\left(x_i\right)_{i=1}^{\infty}$ in $X,$ if $\sum_{i=1}^{\infty} p\left(x_i\right) < \infty$ then $\sum_{i=1}^{\infty} x_i$ converges in $X.$

If $M$ is a closed vector subspace of a complete pseudometrizable TVS $X,$ then the quotient space $X / M$ is complete. If $M$ is a complete vector subspace of a metrizable TVS $X$ and if the quotient space $X / M$ is complete then so is $X.$ If $X$ is not complete then $M := X,$ but not complete, vector subspace of $X.$

A Baire separable topological group is metrizable if and only if it is cosmic.

=== Subsets and subsequences ===
- Let $M$ be a separable locally convex metrizable topological vector space and let $C$ be its completion. If $S$ is a bounded subset of $C$ then there exists a bounded subset $R$ of $X$ such that $S \subseteq \operatorname{cl}_C R.$
- Every totally bounded subset of a locally convex metrizable TVS $X$ is contained in the closed convex balanced hull of some sequence in $X$ that converges to $0.$
- In a pseudometrizable TVS, every bornivore is a neighborhood of the origin.
- If $d$ is a translation invariant metric on a vector space $X,$ then $d(n x, 0) \leq n d(x, 0)$ for all $x \in X$ and every positive integer $n.$
- If $\left(x_i\right)_{i=1}^{\infty}$ is a null sequence (that is, it converges to the origin) in a metrizable TVS then there exists a sequence $\left(r_i\right)_{i=1}^{\infty}$ of positive real numbers diverging to $\infty$ such that $\left(r_i x_i\right)_{i=1}^{\infty} \to 0.$
- A subset of a complete metric space is closed if and only if it is complete. If a space $X$ is not complete, then $X$ is a closed subset of $X$ that is not complete.
- If $X$ is a metrizable locally convex TVS then for every bounded subset $B$ of $X,$ there exists a bounded disk $D$ in $X$ such that $B \subseteq X_D,$ and both $X$ and the auxiliary normed space $X_D$ induce the same subspace topology on $B.$

Banach-Saks theorem—If $\left(x_n\right)_{n=1}^{\infty}$ is a sequence in a locally convex metrizable TVS $(X, \tau)$ that converges weakly to some $x \in X,$ then there exists a sequence $y_{\bull} = \left(y_i\right)_{i=1}^{\infty}$ in $X$ such that $y_{\bull} \to x$ in $(X, \tau)$ and each $y_i$ is a convex combination of finitely many $x_n.$

Mackey's countability condition—Suppose that $X$ is a locally convex metrizable TVS and that $\left(B_i\right)_{i=1}^{\infty}$ is a countable sequence of bounded subsets of $X.$ Then there exists a bounded subset $B$ of $X$ and a sequence $\left(r_i\right)_{i=1}^{\infty}$ of positive real numbers such that $B_i \subseteq r_i B$ for all $i.$

Generalized series

As described in this article's section on generalized series, for any $I$-indexed family family $\left(r_i\right)_{i \in I}$ of vectors from a TVS $X,$ it is possible to define their sum $\textstyle\sum\limits_{i \in I} r_i$ as the limit of the net of finite partial sums $F \in \operatorname{FiniteSubsets}(I) \mapsto \textstyle\sum\limits_{i \in F} r_i$ where the domain $\operatorname{FiniteSubsets}(I)$ is directed by $\,\subseteq.\,$ If $I = \N$ and $X = \Reals,$ for instance, then the generalized series $\textstyle\sum\limits_{i \in \N} r_i$ converges if and only if $\textstyle\sum\limits_{i=1}^\infty r_i$ converges unconditionally in the usual sense (which for real numbers, is equivalent to absolute convergence). If a generalized series $\textstyle\sum\limits_{i \in I} r_i$ converges in a metrizable TVS, then the set $\left\{i \in I : r_i \neq 0\right\}$ is necessarily countable (that is, either finite or countably infinite); (Note: Suppose the net $\textstyle\sum\limits_{i \in I} r_i ~\stackrel{\scriptscriptstyle\text{def}}{=}~ {\textstyle\lim\limits_{A \in \operatorname{FiniteSubsets}(I)}} \ \textstyle\sum\limits_{i \in A} r_i = \lim \left\{\textstyle\sum\limits_{i\in A} r_i \,: A \subseteq I, A \text{ finite }\right\}$ converges to some point in a metrizable TVS $X,$ where recall that this net's domain is the directed set $(\operatorname{FiniteSubsets}(I), \subseteq).$ Like every convergent net, this convergent net of partial sums $A \mapsto \textstyle\sum\limits_{i \in A} r_i$ is a Cauchy net, which for this particular net means (by definition) that for every neighborhood $W$ of the origin in $X,$ there exists a finite subset $A_0$ of $I$ such that $\textstyle\sum\limits_{i \in B} r_i - \textstyle\sum\limits_{i \in C} r_i \in W$ for all finite supersets $B, C \supseteq A_0;$ this implies that $r_i \in W$ for every $i \in I \setminus A_0$ (by taking $B := A_0 \cup \{i\}$ and $C := A_0$). Since $X$ is metrizable, it has a countable neighborhood basis $U_1, U_2, \ldots$ at the origin, whose intersection is necessarily $U_1 \cap U_2 \cap \cdots = \{0\}$ (since $X$ is a Hausdorff TVS). For every positive integer $n \in \N,$ pick a finite subset $A_n \subseteq I$ such that $r_i \in U_n$ for every $i \in I \setminus A_n.$ If $i$ belongs to $(I \setminus A_1) \cap (I \setminus A_2) \cap \cdots = I \setminus \left(A_1 \cup A_2 \cup \cdots\right)$ then $r_i$ belongs to $U_1 \cap U_2 \cap \cdots = \{0\}.$ Thus $r_i = 0$ for every index $i \in I$ that does not belong to the countable set $A_1 \cup A_2 \cup \cdots.$ $\blacksquare$) in other words, all but at most countably many $r_i$ will be zero and so this generalized series $\textstyle\sum\limits_{i \in I} r_i ~=~ \textstyle\sum\limits_{\stackrel{i \in I}{r_i \neq 0}} r_i$ is actually a sum of at most countably many non-zero terms.

=== Linear maps ===
If $X$ is a pseudometrizable TVS and $A$ maps bounded subsets of $X$ to bounded subsets of $Y,$ then $A$ is continuous. Discontinuous linear functionals exist on any infinite-dimensional pseudometrizable TVS. Thus, a pseudometrizable TVS is finite-dimensional if and only if its continuous dual space is equal to its algebraic dual space.

If $F : X \to Y$ is a linear map between TVSs and $X$ is metrizable then the following are equivalent:

1. $F$ is continuous;
2. $F$ is a (locally) bounded map (that is, $F$ maps (von Neumann) bounded subsets of $X$ to bounded subsets of $Y$);
3. $F$ is sequentially continuous;
4. the image under $F$ of every null sequence in $X$ is a bounded set where by definition, a null sequence is a sequence that converges to the origin.
5. $F$ maps null sequences to null sequences;

Open and almost open maps

Theorem: If $X$ is a complete pseudometrizable TVS, $Y$ is a Hausdorff TVS, and $T : X \to Y$ is a closed and almost open linear surjection, then $T$ is an open map.

Theorem: If $T : X \to Y$ is a surjective linear operator from a locally convex space $X$ onto a barrelled space $Y$ (e.g. every complete pseudometrizable space is barrelled) then $T$ is almost open.

Theorem: If $T : X \to Y$ is a surjective linear operator from a TVS $X$ onto a Baire space $Y$ then $T$ is almost open.

Theorem: Suppose $T : X \to Y$ is a continuous linear operator from a complete pseudometrizable TVS $X$ into a Hausdorff TVS $Y.$ If the image of $T$ is non-meager in $Y$ then $T : X \to Y$ is a surjective open map and $Y$ is a complete metrizable space.

=== Hahn-Banach extension property ===
A vector subspace $M$ of a TVS $X$ has the extension property if any continuous linear functional on $M$ can be extended to a continuous linear functional on $X.$ Say that a TVS $X$ has the Hahn-Banach extension property (HBEP) if every vector subspace of $X$ has the extension property.

The Hahn-Banach theorem guarantees that every Hausdorff locally convex space has the HBEP. For complete metrizable TVSs there is a converse:

Theorem (Kalton)—Every complete metrizable TVS with the Hahn-Banach extension property is locally convex.

If a vector space $X$ has uncountable dimension and if we endow it with the finest vector topology then this is a TVS with the HBEP that is neither locally convex or metrizable.

== See also ==
- Asymmetric norm – Generalization of the concept of a norm
- Complete metric space – Metric geometry
- Complete topological vector space – Structure in functional analysis
- Equivalence of metrics – Mathematical notion
- F-space – Topological vector space with a complete translation-invariant metric
- Fréchet space – Locally convex topological vector space that is also a complete metric space
- Generalised metric – Metric geometry
- K-space (functional analysis)
- Locally convex topological vector space – Space with topology generated by convex sets
- Metric space – Mathematical space with a notion of distance
- Pseudometric space – Generalization of metric spaces in mathematics
- Relation of norms and metrics – Mathematical space with a notion of distance
- Seminorm – Mathematical function
- Sublinear function – Type of function in linear algebra
- Uniform space – Topological space with a notion of uniform properties
- Ursescu theorem – Generalization of closed graph, open mapping, and uniform boundedness theorem

== Notes ==
Proofs

== Bibliography ==
- Berberian, Sterling K. (1974). Lectures in Functional Analysis and Operator Theory. Graduate Texts in Mathematics. Vol. 15. New York: Springer. ISBN 978-0-387-90081-0. OCLC 878109401.
- Bourbaki, Nicolas (1987) [1981]. Topological Vector Spaces: Chapters 1–5. Éléments de mathématique. Translated by Eggleston, H.G.; Madan, S. Berlin New York: Springer-Verlag. ISBN 3-540-13627-4. OCLC 17499190.
- Bourbaki, Nicolas (1950). "Sur certains espaces vectoriels topologiques". Annales de l'Institut Fourier (in French). 2: 5–16 (1951). doi:10.5802/aif.16. MR 0042609.
- Edwards, Robert E. (1995). Functional Analysis: Theory and Applications. New York: Dover Publications. ISBN 978-0-486-68143-6. OCLC 30593138.
- Grothendieck, Alexander (1973). Topological Vector Spaces. Translated by Chaljub, Orlando. New York: Gordon and Breach Science Publishers. ISBN 978-0-677-30020-7. OCLC 886098.
- Jarchow, Hans (1981). Locally convex spaces. Stuttgart: B.G. Teubner. ISBN 978-3-519-02224-4. OCLC 8210342.
- Khaleelulla, S. M. (1982). Counterexamples in Topological Vector Spaces. Lecture Notes in Mathematics. Vol. 936. Berlin, Heidelberg, New York: Springer-Verlag. ISBN 978-3-540-11565-6. OCLC 8588370.
- Köthe, Gottfried (1983) [1969]. Topological Vector Spaces I. Grundlehren der mathematischen Wissenschaften. Vol. 159. Translated by Garling, D.J.H. New York: Springer Science & Business Media. ISBN 978-3-642-64988-2. MR 0248498. OCLC 840293704.
- Köthe, Gottfried (1979). Topological Vector Spaces II. Grundlehren der mathematischen Wissenschaften. Vol. 237. New York: Springer Science & Business Media. ISBN 978-0-387-90400-9. OCLC 180577972.
- Narici, Lawrence; Beckenstein, Edward (2011). Topological Vector Spaces. Pure and applied mathematics (Second ed.). Boca Raton, FL: CRC Press. ISBN 978-1584888666. OCLC 144216834.
- Rudin, Walter (1991). Functional Analysis. International Series in Pure and Applied Mathematics. Vol. 8 (Second ed.). New York, NY: McGraw-Hill Science/Engineering/Math. ISBN 978-0-07-054236-5. OCLC 21163277.
- Robertson, Alex P.; Robertson, Wendy J. (1980). Topological Vector Spaces. Cambridge Tracts in Mathematics. Vol. 53. Cambridge England: Cambridge University Press. ISBN 978-0-521-29882-7. OCLC 589250.
- Schaefer, Helmut H.; Wolff, Manfred P. (1999). Topological Vector Spaces. GTM. Vol. 8 (Second ed.). New York, NY: Springer New York Imprint Springer. ISBN 978-1-4612-7155-0. OCLC 840278135.
- Schechter, Eric (1996). Handbook of Analysis and Its Foundations. San Diego, CA: Academic Press. ISBN 978-0-12-622760-4. OCLC 175294365.
- Swartz, Charles (1992). An introduction to Functional Analysis. New York: M. Dekker. ISBN 978-0-8247-8643-4. OCLC 24909067.
- Trèves, François (2006) [1967]. Topological Vector Spaces, Distributions and Kernels. Mineola, N.Y.: Dover Publications. ISBN 978-0-486-45352-1. OCLC 853623322.
- Wilansky, Albert (2013). Modern Methods in Topological Vector Spaces. Mineola, New York: Dover Publications, Inc. ISBN 978-0-486-49353-4. OCLC 849801114.
- Husain, Taqdir (1978). Barrelledness in topological and ordered vector spaces. Berlin New York: Springer-Verlag. ISBN 3-540-09096-7. OCLC 4493665.
