= Distinguished space =

TVS whose strong dual is barralled

In functional analysis and related areas of mathematics, distinguished spaces are topological vector spaces (TVSs) having the property that weak-* bounded subsets of their biduals (that is, the strong dual space of their strong dual space) are contained in the weak-* closure of some bounded subset of the bidual.

== Definition ==
Suppose that $X$ is a locally convex space and let $X^{\prime}$ and $X^{\prime}_b$ denote the strong dual of $X$ (that is, the continuous dual space of $X$ endowed with the strong dual topology). Let $X^{\prime \prime}$ denote the continuous dual space of $X^{\prime}_b$ and let $X^{\prime \prime}_b$ denote the strong dual of $X^{\prime}_b.$ Let $X^{\prime \prime}_{\sigma}$ denote $X^{\prime \prime}$ endowed with the weak-* topology induced by $X^{\prime},$ where this topology is denoted by $\sigma\left(X^{\prime \prime}, X^{\prime}\right)$ (that is, the topology of pointwise convergence on $X^{\prime}$). We say that a subset $W$ of $X^{\prime \prime}$ is $\sigma\left(X^{\prime \prime}, X^{\prime}\right)$-bounded if it is a bounded subset of $X^{\prime \prime}_{\sigma}$ and we call the closure of $W$ in the TVS $X^{\prime \prime}_{\sigma}$ the $\sigma\left(X^{\prime \prime}, X^{\prime}\right)$-closure of $W$. If $B$ is a subset of $X$ then the polar of $B$ is $B^{\circ} := \left\{ x^{\prime} \in X^{\prime} : \sup_{b \in B} \left\langle b, x^{\prime} \right\rangle \leq 1 \right\}.$

A Hausdorff locally convex space $X$ is called a distinguished space if it satisfies any of the following equivalent conditions:

1. If $W \subseteq X^{\prime \prime}$ is a $\sigma\left(X^{\prime \prime}, X^{\prime}\right)$-bounded subset of $X^{\prime \prime}$ then there exists a bounded subset $B$ of $X^{\prime \prime}_b$ whose $\sigma\left(X^{\prime \prime}, X^{\prime}\right)$-closure contains $W$.
2. If $W \subseteq X^{\prime \prime}$ is a $\sigma\left(X^{\prime \prime}, X^{\prime}\right)$-bounded subset of $X^{\prime \prime}$ then there exists a bounded subset $B$ of $X$ such that $W$ is contained in $B^{\circ\circ} := \left\{ x^{\prime\prime} \in X^{\prime\prime} : \sup_{x^{\prime} \in B^{\circ}} \left\langle x^{\prime}, x^{\prime\prime} \right\rangle \leq 1 \right\},$ which is the polar (relative to the duality $\left\langle X^{\prime}, X^{\prime\prime} \right\rangle$) of $B^{\circ}.$
3. The strong dual of $X$ is a barrelled space.

If in addition $X$ is a metrizable locally convex topological vector space then this list may be extended to include:

4. (Grothendieck) The strong dual of $X$ is a bornological space.

== Sufficient conditions ==
All normed spaces and semi-reflexive spaces are distinguished spaces. LF spaces are distinguished spaces.

The strong dual space $X_b^{\prime}$ of a Fréchet space $X$ is distinguished if and only if $X$ is quasibarrelled.

== Properties ==
Every locally convex distinguished space is an H-space.

== Examples ==
There exist distinguished Banach spaces spaces that are not semi-reflexive. The strong dual of a distinguished Banach space is not necessarily separable; $l^{1}$ is such a space. The strong dual space of a distinguished Fréchet space is not necessarily metrizable. There exists a distinguished semi-reflexive non-reflexive non-quasibarrelled Mackey space $X$ whose strong dual is a non-reflexive Banach space. There exist H-spaces that are not distinguished spaces.

Fréchet Montel spaces are distinguished spaces.

== See also ==
- Montel space – Barrelled space where closed and bounded subsets are compact
- Semi-reflexive space

== Bibliography ==
- Bourbaki, Nicolas (1950). "Sur certains espaces vectoriels topologiques". Annales de l'Institut Fourier (in French). 2: 5–16 (1951). doi:10.5802/aif.16. MR 0042609.
- Robertson, Alex P.; Robertson, Wendy J. (1980). Topological Vector Spaces. Cambridge Tracts in Mathematics. Vol. 53. Cambridge England: Cambridge University Press. ISBN 978-0-521-29882-7. OCLC 589250.
- Husain, Taqdir; Khaleelulla, S. M. (1978). Barrelledness in Topological and Ordered Vector Spaces. Lecture Notes in Mathematics. Vol. 692. Berlin, New York, Heidelberg: Springer-Verlag. ISBN 978-3-540-09096-0. OCLC 4493665.
- Jarchow, Hans (1981). Locally convex spaces. Stuttgart: B.G. Teubner. ISBN 978-3-519-02224-4. OCLC 8210342.
- Khaleelulla, S. M. (1982). Counterexamples in Topological Vector Spaces. Lecture Notes in Mathematics. Vol. 936. Berlin, Heidelberg, New York: Springer-Verlag. ISBN 978-3-540-11565-6. OCLC 8588370.
- Narici, Lawrence; Beckenstein, Edward (2011). Topological Vector Spaces. Pure and applied mathematics (Second ed.). Boca Raton, FL: CRC Press. ISBN 978-1584888666. OCLC 144216834.
- Schaefer, Helmut H.; Wolff, Manfred P. (1999). Topological Vector Spaces. GTM. Vol. 8 (Second ed.). New York, NY: Springer New York Imprint Springer. ISBN 978-1-4612-7155-0. OCLC 840278135.
- Trèves, François (2006) [1967]. Topological Vector Spaces, Distributions and Kernels. Mineola, N.Y.: Dover Publications. ISBN 978-0-486-45352-1. OCLC 853623322.
