= DF-space =

In the mathematical field of functional analysis, DF-spaces, also written (DF)-spaces are locally convex topological vector space having a property that is shared by locally convex metrizable topological vector spaces. They play a considerable part in the theory of topological tensor products.

DF-spaces were first defined by Alexander Grothendieck and studied in detail by him in (Grothendieck 1954). Grothendieck was led to introduce these spaces by the following property of strong duals of metrizable spaces: If $X$ is a metrizable locally convex space and $V_1, V_2, \ldots$ is a sequence of convex 0-neighborhoods in $X^{\prime}_b$ such that $V := \cap_{i} V_i$ absorbs every strongly bounded set, then $V$ is a 0-neighborhood in $X^{\prime}_b$ (where $X^{\prime}_b$ is the continuous dual space of $X$ endowed with the strong dual topology).

== Definition ==
A locally convex topological vector space (TVS) $X$ is a DF-space, also written (DF)-space, if

1. $X$ is a countably quasi-barrelled space (i.e. every strongly bounded countable union of equicontinuous subsets of $X^{\prime}$ is equicontinuous), and
2. $X$ possesses a fundamental sequence of bounded (i.e. there exists a countable sequence of bounded subsets $B_1, B_2, \ldots$ such that every bounded subset of $X$ is contained in some $B_i$).

== Properties ==
- Let $X$ be a DF-space and let $V$ be a convex balanced subset of $X.$ Then $V$ is a neighborhood of the origin if and only if for every convex, balanced, bounded subset $B \subseteq X,$ $B \cap V$ is a neighborhood of the origin in $B.$ Consequently, a linear map from a DF-space into a locally convex space is continuous if its restriction to each bounded subset of the domain is continuous.
- The strong dual space of a DF-space is a Fréchet space.
- Every infinite-dimensional Montel DF-space is a sequential space but not a Fréchet–Urysohn space.
- Suppose $X$ is either a DF-space or an LM-space. If $X$ is a sequential space then it is either metrizable or else a Montel space DF-space.
- Every quasi-complete DF-space is complete.
- If $X$ is a complete nuclear DF-space then $X$ is a Montel space.

== Sufficient conditions ==
The strong dual space $X_b^{\prime}$ of a Fréchet space $X$ is a DF-space.

- The strong dual of a metrizable locally convex space is a DF-space but the convers is in general not true (the converse being the statement that every DF-space is the strong dual of some metrizable locally convex space). From this it follows:
  - Every normed space is a DF-space.
  - Every Banach space is a DF-space.
  - Every infrabarreled space possessing a fundamental sequence of bounded sets is a DF-space.
- Every Hausdorff quotient of a DF-space is a DF-space.
- The completion of a DF-space is a DF-space.
- The locally convex sum of a sequence of DF-spaces is a DF-space.
- An inductive limit of a sequence of DF-spaces is a DF-space.
- Suppose that $X$ and $Y$ are DF-spaces. Then the projective tensor product, as well as its completion, of these spaces is a DF-space.

However,

- An infinite product of non-trivial DF-spaces (i.e. all factors have non-0 dimension) is not a DF-space.
- A closed vector subspace of a DF-space is not necessarily a DF-space.
- There exist complete DF-spaces that are not TVS-isomorphic to the strong dual of a metrizable locally convex TVS.

== Examples ==
There exist complete DF-spaces that are not TVS-isomorphic with the strong dual of a metrizable locally convex space. There exist DF-spaces having closed vector subspaces that are not DF-spaces.

== See also ==
- Barreled space – Type of topological vector space
- Countably quasi-barrelled space
- F-space – Topological vector space with a complete translation-invariant metric
- LB-space
- LF-space – Topological vector space
- Nuclear space – Generalization of finite-dimensional Euclidean spaces different from Hilbert spaces
- Projective tensor product

== Bibliography ==
- Grothendieck, Alexander (1954). "Sur les espaces (F) et (DF)". Summa Brasil. Math. (in French). 3: 57–123. MR 0075542.
- Grothendieck, Alexander (1955). "Produits Tensoriels Topologiques et Espaces Nucléaires" [Topological Tensor Products and Nuclear Spaces]. Memoirs of the American Mathematical Society Series (in French). 16. Providence: American Mathematical Society. MR 0075539. OCLC 9308061.
- Khaleelulla, S. M. (1982). Counterexamples in Topological Vector Spaces. Lecture Notes in Mathematics. Vol. 936. Berlin, Heidelberg, New York: Springer-Verlag. ISBN 978-3-540-11565-6. OCLC 8588370.
- Pietsch, Albrecht (1979). Nuclear Locally Convex Spaces. Ergebnisse der Mathematik und ihrer Grenzgebiete. Vol. 66 (Second ed.). Berlin, New York: Springer-Verlag. ISBN 978-0-387-05644-9. OCLC 539541.
- Pietsch, Albrecht (1972). Nuclear locally convex spaces. Berlin, New York: Springer-Verlag. ISBN 0-387-05644-0. OCLC 539541.
- Schaefer, Helmut H.; Wolff, Manfred P. (1999). Topological Vector Spaces. GTM. Vol. 8 (Second ed.). New York, NY: Springer New York Imprint Springer. ISBN 978-1-4612-7155-0. OCLC 840278135.
- Wong, Yau-Chuen (1979). Schwartz Spaces, Nuclear Spaces, and Tensor Products. Lecture Notes in Mathematics. Vol. 726. Berlin New York: Springer-Verlag. ISBN 978-3-540-09513-2. OCLC 5126158.
