= Ptak space =

A locally convex topological vector space (TVS) $X$ is B-complete or a Ptak space if every subspace $Q \subseteq X^{\prime}$ is closed in the weak-* topology on $X^{\prime}$ (i.e. $X^{\prime}_{\sigma}$ or $\sigma\left(X^{\prime}, X \right)$) whenever $Q \cap A$ is closed in $A$ (when $A$ is given the subspace topology from $X^{\prime}_{\sigma}$) for each equicontinuous subset $A \subseteq X^{\prime}$.

B-completeness is related to $B_r$-completeness, where a locally convex TVS $X$ is $B_r$-complete if every dense subspace $Q \subseteq X^{\prime}$ is closed in $X^{\prime}_{\sigma}$ whenever $Q \cap A$ is closed in $A$ (when $A$ is given the subspace topology from $X^{\prime}_{\sigma}$) for each equicontinuous subset $A \subseteq X^{\prime}$.

== Characterizations ==
Throughout this section, $X$ will be a locally convex topological vector space (TVS).

The following are equivalent:

1. $X$ is a Ptak space.
2. Every continuous nearly open linear map of $X$ into any locally convex space $Y$ is a topological homomorphism.

- A linear map $u : X \to Y$ is called nearly open if for each neighborhood $U$ of the origin in $X$, $u(U)$ is dense in some neighborhood of the origin in $u(X).$

The following are equivalent:

1. $X$ is $B_r$-complete.
2. Every continuous biunivocal, nearly open linear map of $X$ into any locally convex space $Y$ is a TVS-isomorphism.

== Properties ==
Every Ptak space is complete. However, there exist complete Hausdorff locally convex space that are not Ptak spaces.

Homomorphism Theorem—Every continuous linear map from a Ptak space onto a barreled space is a topological homomorphism.

Let $u$ be a nearly open linear map whose domain is dense in a $B_r$-complete space $X$ and whose range is a locally convex space $Y$. Suppose that the graph of $u$ is closed in $X \times Y$. If $u$ is injective or if $X$ is a Ptak space then $u$ is an open map.

== Examples and sufficient conditions ==
There exist B_{r}-complete spaces that are not B-complete.

Every Fréchet space is a Ptak space. The strong dual of a reflexive Fréchet space is a Ptak space.

Every closed vector subspace of a Ptak space (resp. a B_{r}-complete space) is a Ptak space (resp. a $B_r$-complete space). and every Hausdorff quotient of a Ptak space is a Ptak space. If every Hausdorff quotient of a TVS $X$ is a B_{r}-complete space then $X$ is a B-complete space.

If $X$ is a locally convex space such that there exists a continuous nearly open surjection $u : P \to X$ from a Ptak space, then $X$ is a Ptak space.

If a TVS $X$ has a closed hyperplane that is B-complete (resp. B_{r}-complete) then $X$ is B-complete (resp. B_{r}-complete).

== See also ==
- Barreled space – Type of topological vector space

== Bibliography ==
- Husain, Taqdir; Khaleelulla, S. M. (1978). Barrelledness in Topological and Ordered Vector Spaces. Lecture Notes in Mathematics. Vol. 692. Berlin, New York, Heidelberg: Springer-Verlag. ISBN 978-3-540-09096-0. OCLC 4493665.
- Khaleelulla, S. M. (1982). Counterexamples in Topological Vector Spaces. Lecture Notes in Mathematics. Vol. 936. Berlin, Heidelberg, New York: Springer-Verlag. ISBN 978-3-540-11565-6. OCLC 8588370.
- Narici, Lawrence; Beckenstein, Edward (2011). Topological Vector Spaces. Pure and applied mathematics (Second ed.). Boca Raton, FL: CRC Press. ISBN 978-1584888666. OCLC 144216834.
- Schaefer, Helmut H.; Wolff, Manfred P. (1999). Topological Vector Spaces. GTM. Vol. 8 (Second ed.). New York, NY: Springer New York Imprint Springer. ISBN 978-1-4612-7155-0. OCLC 840278135.
