= Semi-reflexive space =

In the area of mathematics known as functional analysis, a semi-reflexive space is a locally convex topological vector space (TVS) X such that the canonical evaluation map from X into its bidual (which is the strong dual of X) is bijective. If this map is also an isomorphism of TVSs then it is called reflexive.

Semi-reflexive spaces play an important role in the general theory of locally convex TVSs. Since a normable TVS is semi-reflexive if and only if it is reflexive, the concept of semi-reflexivity is primarily used with TVSs that are not normable.

== Definition and notation ==
=== Brief definition ===
Suppose that X is a topological vector space (TVS) over the field $\mathbb{F}$ (which is either the real or complex numbers) whose continuous dual space, $X^{\prime}$, separates points on X (i.e. for any $x \in X$ there exists some $x^{\prime} \in X^{\prime}$ such that $x^{\prime}(x) \neq 0$). Let $X^{\prime}_b$ and $X^{\prime}_{\beta}$ both denote the strong dual of X, which is the vector space $X^{\prime}$ of continuous linear functionals on X endowed with the topology of uniform convergence on bounded subsets of X; this topology is also called the strong dual topology and it is the "default" topology placed on a continuous dual space (unless another topology is specified). If X is a normed space, then the strong dual of X is the continuous dual space $X^{\prime}$ with its usual norm topology. The bidual of X, denoted by $X^{\prime\prime}$, is the strong dual of $X^{\prime}_b$; that is, it is the space $\left(X^{\prime}_b\right)^{\prime}_{b}$.

For any $x \in X,$ let $J_x : X^{\prime} \to \mathbb{F}$ be defined by $J_x\left(x^{\prime}\right) = x^{\prime}(x)$, where $J_x$ is called the evaluation map at x; since $J_x : X^{\prime}_b \to \mathbb{F}$ is necessarily continuous, it follows that $J_x \in \left(X^{\prime}_b\right)^{\prime}$. Since $X^{\prime}$ separates points on X, the map $J : X \to \left(X^{\prime}_b\right)^{\prime}$ defined by $J(x) := J_x$ is injective where this map is called the evaluation map or the canonical map. This map was introduced by Hans Hahn in 1927.

We call X semireflexive if $J : X \to \left(X^{\prime}_b\right)^{\prime}$ is bijective (or equivalently, surjective) and we call X reflexive if in addition $J : X \to X^{\prime\prime} = \left(X^{\prime}_b\right)^{\prime}_b$ is an isomorphism of TVSs. If X is a normed space then J is a TVS-embedding as well as an isometry onto its range; furthermore, by Goldstine's theorem (proved in 1938), the range of J is a dense subset of the bidual $\left(X^{\prime\prime}, \sigma\left(X^{\prime\prime}, X^{\prime}\right)\right)$. A normable space is reflexive if and only if it is semi-reflexive. A Banach space is reflexive if and only if its closed unit ball is $\sigma\left(X^{\prime}, X\right)$-compact.

=== Detailed definition ===
Let X be a topological vector space over a number field $\mathbb{F}$ (of real numbers $\R$ or complex numbers $\C$). Consider its strong dual space $X^{\prime}_b$, which consists of all continuous linear functionals $f : X \to \mathbb{F}$ and is equipped with the strong topology $b\left(X^{\prime}, X\right)$, that is, the topology of uniform convergence on bounded subsets in X. The space $X^{\prime}_b$ is a topological vector space (to be more precise, a locally convex space), so one can consider its strong dual space $\left(X^{\prime}_b\right)^{\prime}_{b}$, which is called the strong bidual space for X. It consists of all continuous linear functionals $h : X^{\prime}_b \to {\mathbb F}$ and is equipped with the strong topology $b\left(\left(X^{\prime}_b\right)^{\prime}, X^{\prime}_b \right)$. Each vector $x\in X$ generates a map $J(x) : X^{\prime}_b \to \mathbb{F}$ by the following formula:

$$J(x)(f) = f(x),\qquad f \in X'.$$

This is a continuous linear functional on $X^{\prime}_b$, that is, $J(x) \in \left(X^{\prime}_b\right)^{\prime}_{b}$. One obtains a map called the evaluation map or the canonical injection:

$$J : X \to \left(X^{\prime}_b\right)^{\prime}_{b}.$$

which is a linear map. If X is locally convex, from the Hahn–Banach theorem it follows that J is injective and open (that is, for each neighbourhood of zero $U$ in X there is a neighbourhood of zero V in $\left(X^{\prime}_b\right)^{\prime}_{b}$ such that $J(U) \supseteq V \cap J(X)$). But it can be non-surjective and/or discontinuous.

A locally convex space $X$ is called semi-reflexive if the evaluation map $J : X \to \left(X^{\prime}_b\right)^{\prime}_{b}$ is surjective (hence bijective); it is called reflexive if the evaluation map $J : X \to \left(X^{\prime}_b\right)^{\prime}_{b}$ is surjective and continuous, in which case J will be an isomorphism of TVSs).

== Characterizations of semi-reflexive spaces ==
If X is a Hausdorff locally convex space then the following are equivalent:

1. X is semireflexive;
2. the weak topology on X had the Heine-Borel property (that is, for the weak topology $\sigma\left(X, X^{\prime}\right)$, every closed and bounded subset of $X_{\sigma}$ is weakly compact).
3. If linear form on $X^{\prime}$ that continuous when $X^{\prime}$ has the strong dual topology, then it is continuous when $X^{\prime}$ has the weak topology;
4. $X^{\prime}_{\tau}$ is barrelled, where the $\tau$ indicates the Mackey topology on $X^{\prime}$;
5. X weak the weak topology $\sigma\left(X, X^{\prime}\right)$ is quasi-complete.

Theorem—A locally convex Hausdorff space $X$ is semi-reflexive if and only if $X$ with the $\sigma\left(X, X^{\prime}\right)$-topology has the Heine–Borel property (i.e. weakly closed and bounded subsets of $X$ are weakly compact).

== Sufficient conditions ==
Every semi-Montel space is semi-reflexive and every Montel space is reflexive.

== Properties ==
If $X$ is a Hausdorff locally convex space then the canonical injection from $X$ into its bidual is a topological embedding if and only if $X$ is infrabarrelled.

The strong dual of a semireflexive space is barrelled. Every semi-reflexive space is quasi-complete. Every semi-reflexive normed space is a reflexive Banach space. The strong dual of a semireflexive space is barrelled.

== Reflexive spaces ==
If X is a Hausdorff locally convex space then the following are equivalent:

1. X is reflexive;
2. X is semireflexive and barrelled;
3. X is barrelled and the weak topology on X had the Heine-Borel property (which means that for the weak topology $\sigma\left(X, X^{\prime}\right)$, every closed and bounded subset of $X_{\sigma}$ is weakly compact).
4. X is semireflexive and quasibarrelled.

If X is a normed space then the following are equivalent:

1. X is reflexive;
2. the closed unit ball is compact when X has the weak topology $\sigma\left(X, X^{\prime}\right)$.
3. X is a Banach space and $X^{\prime}_b$ is reflexive.

== Examples ==
Every non-reflexive infinite-dimensional Banach space is a distinguished space that is not semi-reflexive. If $X$ is a dense proper vector subspace of a reflexive Banach space then $X$ is a normed space that not semi-reflexive but its strong dual space is a reflexive Banach space. There exists a semi-reflexive countably barrelled space that is not barrelled.

== See also ==
- Grothendieck space - A generalization which has some of the properties of reflexive spaces and includes many spaces of practical importance.
- Reflexive operator algebra
- Reflexive space

== Bibliography ==
- Edwards, Robert E. (1995). Functional Analysis: Theory and Applications. New York: Dover Publications. ISBN 978-0-486-68143-6. OCLC 30593138.
- Edwards, R. E. (1965). Functional analysis. Theory and applications. New York: Holt, Rinehart and Winston. ISBN 0030505356.
- John B. Conway, A Course in Functional Analysis, Springer, 1985.
- James, Robert C. (1972), Some self-dual properties of normed linear spaces. Symposium on Infinite-Dimensional Topology (Louisiana State Univ., Baton Rouge, La., 1967), Ann. of Math. Studies, vol. 69, Princeton, NJ: Princeton Univ. Press, pp. 159–175.
- Khaleelulla, S. M. (1982). Counterexamples in Topological Vector Spaces. Lecture Notes in Mathematics. Vol. 936. Berlin, Heidelberg, New York: Springer-Verlag. ISBN 978-3-540-11565-6. OCLC 8588370.
- Kolmogorov, A. N.; Fomin, S. V. (1957). Elements of the Theory of Functions and Functional Analysis, Volume 1: Metric and Normed Spaces. Rochester: Graylock Press.
- Megginson, Robert E. (1998), An introduction to Banach space theory, Graduate Texts in Mathematics, vol. 183, New York: Springer-Verlag, pp. xx+596, ISBN 0-387-98431-3.
- Narici, Lawrence; Beckenstein, Edward (2011). Topological Vector Spaces. Pure and applied mathematics (Second ed.). Boca Raton, FL: CRC Press. ISBN 978-1584888666. OCLC 144216834.
- Schaefer, Helmut H.; Wolff, Manfred P. (1999). Topological Vector Spaces. GTM. Vol. 8 (Second ed.). New York, NY: Springer New York Imprint Springer. ISBN 978-1-4612-7155-0. OCLC 840278135.
- Schechter, Eric (1996). Handbook of Analysis and Its Foundations. San Diego, CA: Academic Press. ISBN 978-0-12-622760-4. OCLC 175294365.
- Trèves, François (2006) [1967]. Topological Vector Spaces, Distributions and Kernels. Mineola, N.Y.: Dover Publications. ISBN 978-0-486-45352-1. OCLC 853623322.
- Wilansky, Albert (2013). Modern Methods in Topological Vector Spaces. Mineola, New York: Dover Publications, Inc. ISBN 978-0-486-49353-4. OCLC 849801114.
