= Hypocontinuous bilinear map =

In mathematics, a hypocontinuous is a condition on bilinear maps of topological vector spaces that is weaker than continuity but stronger than separate continuity. Many important bilinear maps that are not continuous are, in fact, hypocontinuous.

== Definition ==
If $X$, $Y$ and $Z$ are topological vector spaces then a bilinear map $\beta: X\times Y\to Z$ is called hypocontinuous if the following two conditions hold:

- for every bounded set $A\subseteq X$ the set of linear maps $\{\beta(x,\cdot) \mid x\in A\}$ is an equicontinuous subset of $Hom(Y,Z)$, and
- for every bounded set $B\subseteq Y$ the set of linear maps $\{\beta(\cdot,y) \mid y\in B\}$ is an equicontinuous subset of $Hom(X,Z)$.

== Sufficient conditions ==
Theorem: Let X and Y be barreled spaces and let Z be a locally convex space. Then every separately continuous bilinear map of $X \times Y$ into Z is hypocontinuous.

== Examples ==
- If X is a Hausdorff locally convex barreled space over the field $\mathbb{F}$, then the bilinear map $X \times X^{\prime} \to \mathbb{F}$ defined by $\left( x, x^{\prime} \right) \mapsto \left\langle x, x^{\prime} \right\rangle := x^{\prime}\left( x \right)$ is hypocontinuous.

== See also ==
- Bilinear map – Function of two vectors linear in each argument
- Dual system

== Bibliography ==
- Bourbaki, Nicolas (1987), Topological vector spaces, Elements of mathematics, Berlin, New York: Springer-Verlag, ISBN 978-3-540-13627-9
- Narici, Lawrence; Beckenstein, Edward (2011). Topological Vector Spaces. Pure and applied mathematics (Second ed.). Boca Raton, FL: CRC Press. ISBN 978-1584888666. OCLC 144216834.
- Schaefer, Helmut H.; Wolff, Manfred P. (1999). Topological Vector Spaces. GTM. Vol. 8 (Second ed.). New York, NY: Springer New York Imprint Springer. ISBN 978-1-4612-7155-0. OCLC 840278135.
- Trèves, François (2006) [1967]. Topological Vector Spaces, Distributions and Kernels. Mineola, N.Y.: Dover Publications. ISBN 978-0-486-45352-1. OCLC 853623322.
