= Barrelled space =

Type of topological vector space

In functional analysis and related areas of mathematics, a barrelled space (also written barreled space) is a topological vector space (TVS) for which every barrelled set in the space is a neighbourhood for the zero vector. A barrelled set or a barrel in a topological vector space is a set that is convex, balanced, absorbing, and closed. Barrelled spaces are studied because a form of the Banach–Steinhaus theorem still holds for them. Barrelled spaces were introduced by Bourbaki (1950).

== Barrels ==
A convex and balanced subset of a real or complex vector space is called a disk and it is said to be disked, absolutely convex, or convex balanced.

A barrel or a barrelled set in a topological vector space (TVS) is a subset that is a closed absorbing disk; that is, a barrel is a convex, balanced, closed, and absorbing subset.

Every barrel must contain the origin. If $\dim X \geq 2$ and if $S$ is any subset of $X,$ then $S$ is a convex, balanced, and absorbing set of $X$ if and only if this is all true of $S \cap Y$ in $Y$ for every $2$-dimensional vector subspace $Y;$ thus if $\dim X > 2$ then the requirement that a barrel be a closed subset of $X$ is the only defining property that does not depend solely on $2$ (or lower)-dimensional vector subspaces of $X.$

If $X$ is any TVS then every closed convex and balanced neighborhood of the origin is necessarily a barrel in $X$ (because every neighborhood of the origin is necessarily an absorbing subset). In fact, every locally convex topological vector space has a neighborhood basis at its origin consisting entirely of barrels. However, in general, there might exist barrels that are not neighborhoods of the origin; "barrelled spaces" are exactly those TVSs in which every barrel is necessarily a neighborhood of the origin. Every finite dimensional topological vector space is a barrelled space so examples of barrels that are not neighborhoods of the origin can only be found in infinite dimensional spaces.

=== Examples of barrels and non-barrels ===
The closure of any convex, balanced, and absorbing subset is a barrel. This is because the closure of any convex (respectively, any balanced, any absorbing) subset has this same property.

A family of examples: Suppose that $X$ is equal to $\Complex$ (if considered as a complex vector space) or equal to $\R^2$ (if considered as a real vector space). Regardless of whether $X$ is a real or complex vector space, every barrel in $X$ is necessarily a neighborhood of the origin (so $X$ is an example of a barrelled space). Let $R : [0, 2\pi) \to (0, \infty]$ be any function and for every angle $\theta \in [0, 2 \pi),$ let $S_{\theta}$ denote the closed line segment from the origin to the point $R(\theta) e^{i \theta} \in \Complex.$ Let $S := \bigcup_{\theta \in [0, 2 \pi)} S_{\theta}.$ Then $S$ is always an absorbing subset of $\R^2$ (a real vector space) but it is an absorbing subset of $\Complex$ (a complex vector space) if and only if it is a neighborhood of the origin. Moreover, $S$ is a balanced subset of $\R^2$ if and only if $R(\theta) = R(\pi + \theta)$ for every $0 \leq \theta < \pi$ (if this is the case then $R$ and $S$ are completely determined by $R$'s values on $[0, \pi)$) but $S$ is a balanced subset of $\Complex$ if and only it is an open or closed ball centered at the origin (of radius $0 < r \leq \infty$). In particular, barrels in $\Complex$ are exactly those closed balls centered at the origin with radius in $(0, \infty].$ If $R(\theta) := 2 \pi - \theta$ then $S$ is a closed subset that is absorbing in $\R^2$ but not absorbing in $\Complex,$ and that is neither convex, balanced, nor a neighborhood of the origin in $X.$ By an appropriate choice of the function $R,$ it is also possible to have $S$ be a balanced and absorbing subset of $\R^2$ that is neither closed nor convex. To have $S$ be a balanced, absorbing, and closed subset of $\R^2$ that is neither convex nor a neighborhood of the origin, define $R$ on $[0, \pi)$ as follows: for $0 \leq \theta < \pi,$ let $R(\theta) := \pi - \theta$ (alternatively, it can be any positive function on $[0, \pi)$ that is continuously differentiable, which guarantees that $\lim_{\theta \searrow 0} R(\theta) = R(0) > 0$ and that $S$ is closed, and that also satisfies $\lim_{\theta \nearrow \pi} R(\theta) = 0,$ which prevents $S$ from being a neighborhood of the origin) and then extend $R$ to $[\pi, 2 \pi)$ by defining $R(\theta) := R(\theta - \pi),$ which guarantees that $S$ is balanced in $\R^2.$

=== Properties of barrels ===
- In any topological vector space (TVS) $X,$ every barrel in $X$ absorbs every compact convex subset of $X.$
- In any locally convex Hausdorff TVS $X,$ every barrel in $X$ absorbs every convex bounded complete subset of $X.$
- If $X$ is locally convex then a subset $H$ of $X^{\prime}$ is $\sigma\left(X^{\prime}, X\right)$-bounded if and only if there exists a barrel $B$ in $X$ such that $H \subseteq B^{\circ}.$
- Let $(X, Y, b)$ be a pairing and let $\nu$ be a locally convex topology on $X$ consistent with duality. Then a subset $B$ of $X$ is a barrel in $(X, \nu)$ if and only if $B$ is the polar of some $\sigma(Y, X, b)$-bounded subset of $Y.$
- Suppose $M$ is a vector subspace of finite codimension in a locally convex space $X$ and $B \subseteq M.$ If $B$ is a barrel (resp. bornivorous barrel, bornivorous disk) in $M$ then there exists a barrel (resp. bornivorous barrel, bornivorous disk) $C$ in $X$ such that $B = C \cap M.$

== Characterizations of barreled spaces ==
Denote by $L(X; Y)$ the space of continuous linear maps from $X$ into $Y.$

If $(X, \tau)$ is a Hausdorff topological vector space (TVS) with continuous dual space $X^{\prime}$ then the following are equivalent:

1. $X$ is barrelled.
2. Definition: Every barrel in $X$ is a neighborhood of the origin.
  - This definition is similar to a characterization of Baire TVSs proved by Saxon [1974], who proved that a TVS $Y$ with a topology that is not the indiscrete topology is a Baire space if and only if every absorbing balanced subset is a neighborhood of some point of $Y$ (not necessarily the origin).
3. For any Hausdorff TVS $Y$ every pointwise bounded subset of $L(X; Y)$ is equicontinuous.
4. For any F-space $Y$ every pointwise bounded subset of $L(X; Y)$ is equicontinuous.
  - An F-space is a complete metrizable TVS.
5. Every closed linear operator from $X$ into a complete metrizable TVS is continuous.
  - A linear map $F : X \to Y$ is called closed if its graph is a closed subset of $X \times Y.$
6. Every Hausdorff TVS topology $\nu$ on $X$ that has a neighborhood basis of the origin consisting of $\tau$-closed set is coarser than $\tau.$

If $(X, \tau)$ is locally convex space then this list may be extended by appending:

7. There exists a TVS $Y$ not carrying the indiscrete topology (so in particular, $Y \neq \{0\}$) such that every pointwise bounded subset of $L(X; Y)$ is equicontinuous.
8. For any locally convex TVS $Y,$ every pointwise bounded subset of $L(X; Y)$ is equicontinuous.
  - It follows from the above two characterizations that in the class of locally convex TVS, barrelled spaces are exactly those for which the uniform boundedness principle holds.
9. Every $\sigma\left(X^{\prime}, X\right)$-bounded subset of the continuous dual space $X$ is equicontinuous (this provides a partial converse to the Banach-Steinhaus theorem).
10. $X$ carries the strong dual topology $\beta\left(X, X^{\prime}\right).$
11. Every lower semicontinuous seminorm on $X$ is continuous.
12. Every linear map $F : X \to Y$ into a locally convex space $Y$ is almost continuous.
  - A linear map $F : X \to Y$ is called almost continuous if for every neighborhood $V$ of the origin in $Y,$ the closure of $F^{-1}(V)$ is a neighborhood of the origin in $X.$
13. Every surjective linear map $F : Y \to X$ from a locally convex space $Y$ is almost open.
  - This means that for every neighborhood $V$ of 0 in $Y,$ the closure of $F(V)$ is a neighborhood of 0 in $X.$
14. If $\omega$ is a locally convex topology on $X$ such that $(X, \omega)$ has a neighborhood basis at the origin consisting of $\tau$-closed sets, then $\omega$ is weaker than $\tau.$

If $X$ is a Hausdorff locally convex space then this list may be extended by appending:

15. Closed graph theorem: Every closed linear operator $F : X \to Y$ into a Banach space $Y$ is continuous.
  - The linear operator is called closed if its graph is a closed subset of $X \times Y.$
16. For every subset $A$ of the continuous dual space of $X,$ the following properties are equivalent: $A$ is
  1. equicontinuous;
  2. relatively weakly compact;
  3. strongly bounded;
  4. weakly bounded.
17. The 0-neighborhood bases in $X$ and the fundamental families of bounded sets in $X_{\beta}^{\prime}$ correspond to each other by polarity.

If $X$ is metrizable topological vector space then this list may be extended by appending:

18. For any complete metrizable TVS $Y$ every pointwise bounded sequence in $L(X; Y)$ is equicontinuous.

If $X$ is a locally convex metrizable topological vector space then this list may be extended by appending:

19. (Property S): The weak* topology on $X^{\prime}$ is sequentially complete.
20. (Property C): Every weak* bounded subset of $X^{\prime}$ is $\sigma\left(X^{\prime}, X\right)$-relatively countably compact.
21. (𝜎-barrelled): Every countable weak* bounded subset of $X^{\prime}$ is equicontinuous.
22. (Baire-like): $X$ is not the union of an increase sequence of nowhere dense disks.

== Examples and sufficient conditions ==
Each of the following topological vector spaces is barreled:

1. TVSs that are Baire space.
  - Consequently, every topological vector space that is of the second category in itself is barrelled.
2. F-spaces, Fréchet spaces, Banach spaces, and Hilbert spaces.
  - However, there exist normed vector spaces that are not barrelled. For example, if the $L^p$-space $L^2([0, 1])$ is topologized as a subspace of $L^1([0, 1]),$ then it is not barrelled.
3. Complete pseudometrizable TVSs.
  - Consequently, every finite-dimensional TVS is barrelled.
4. Montel spaces.
5. Strong dual spaces of Montel spaces (since they are necessarily Montel spaces).
6. A locally convex quasi-barrelled space that is also a σ-barrelled space.
7. A sequentially complete quasibarrelled space.
8. A quasi-complete Hausdorff locally convex infrabarrelled space.
  - A TVS is called quasi-complete if every closed and bounded subset is complete.
9. A TVS with a dense barrelled vector subspace.
  - Thus the completion of a barreled space is barrelled.
10. A Hausdorff locally convex TVS with a dense infrabarrelled vector subspace.
  - Thus the completion of an infrabarrelled Hausdorff locally convex space is barrelled.
11. A vector subspace of a barrelled space that has countable codimensional.
  - In particular, a finite codimensional vector subspace of a barrelled space is barreled.
12. A locally convex ultrabarelled TVS.
13. A Hausdorff locally convex TVS $X$ such that every weakly bounded subset of its continuous dual space is equicontinuous.
14. A locally convex TVS $X$ such that for every Banach space $B,$ a closed linear map of $X$ into $B$ is necessarily continuous.
15. A product of a family of barreled spaces.
16. A locally convex direct sum and the inductive limit of a family of barrelled spaces.
17. A quotient of a barrelled space.
18. A Hausdorff sequentially complete quasibarrelled boundedly summing TVS.
19. A locally convex Hausdorff reflexive space is barrelled.

=== Counterexamples ===
- A barrelled space need not be Montel, complete, metrizable, unordered Baire-like, nor the inductive limit of Banach spaces.
- Not all normed spaces are barrelled. However, they are all infrabarrelled.
- A closed subspace of a barreled space is not necessarily countably quasi-barreled (and thus not necessarily barrelled).
- There exists a dense vector subspace of the Fréchet barrelled space $\R^{\N}$ that is not barrelled.
- There exist complete locally convex TVSs that are not barrelled.
- The finest locally convex topology on an infinite-dimensional vector space is a Hausdorff barrelled space that is a meagre subset of itself (and thus not a Baire space).

== Properties of barreled spaces ==
=== Banach–Steinhaus generalization ===
The importance of barrelled spaces is due mainly to the following results.

Theorem—Let $X$ be a barrelled TVS and $Y$ be a locally convex TVS. Let $H$ be a subset of the space $L(X ;Y)$ of continuous linear maps from $X$ into $Y$. The following are equivalent:

1. $H$ is bounded for the topology of pointwise convergence;
2. $H$ is bounded for the topology of bounded convergence;
3. $H$ is equicontinuous.

The Banach-Steinhaus theorem is a corollary of the above result. When the vector space $Y$ consists of the complex numbers then the following generalization also holds.

Theorem—If $X$ is a barrelled TVS over the complex numbers and $H$ is a subset of the continuous dual space of $X$, then the following are equivalent:

1. $H$ is weakly bounded;
2. $H$ is strongly bounded;
3. $H$ is equicontinuous;
4. $H$ is relatively compact in the weak dual topology.

Recall that a linear map $F : X \to Y$ is called closed if its graph is a closed subset of $X \times Y.$

Closed Graph Theorem—Every closed linear operator from a Hausdorff barrelled TVS into a complete metrizable TVS is continuous.

=== Other properties ===
- Every Hausdorff barrelled space is quasi-barrelled.
- A linear map from a barrelled space into a locally convex space is almost continuous.
- A linear map from a locally convex space onto a barrelled space is almost open.
- A separately continuous bilinear map from a product of barrelled spaces into a locally convex space is hypocontinuous.
- A linear map with a closed graph from a barreled TVS into a $B_r$-complete TVS is necessarily continuous.

== See also ==
- Barrelled set
- Countably barrelled space
- Distinguished space – TVS whose strong dual is barralled
- Quasibarrelled space
- Ultrabarrelled space
- Uniform boundedness principle#Generalisations – Theorem stating that pointwise boundedness implies uniform boundedness
- Ursescu theorem – Generalization of closed graph, open mapping, and uniform boundedness theorem
- Webbed space – Space where open mapping and closed graph theorems hold

== Bibliography ==
- Adasch, Norbert; Ernst, Bruno; Keim, Dieter (1978). Topological Vector Spaces: The Theory Without Convexity Conditions. Lecture Notes in Mathematics. Vol. 639. Berlin New York: Springer-Verlag. ISBN 978-3-540-08662-8. OCLC 297140003.
- Berberian, Sterling K. (1974). Lectures in Functional Analysis and Operator Theory. Graduate Texts in Mathematics. Vol. 15. New York: Springer. ISBN 978-0-387-90081-0. OCLC 878109401.
- Bourbaki, Nicolas (1950). "Sur certains espaces vectoriels topologiques". Annales de l'Institut Fourier (in French). 2: 5–16 (1951). doi:10.5802/aif.16. MR 0042609.
- Bourbaki, Nicolas (1987) [1981]. Topological Vector Spaces: Chapters 1–5. Éléments de mathématique. Translated by Eggleston, H.G.; Madan, S. Berlin New York: Springer-Verlag. ISBN 3-540-13627-4. OCLC 17499190.
- Conway, John B. (1990). A Course in Functional Analysis. Graduate Texts in Mathematics. Vol. 96 (2nd ed.). New York: Springer-Verlag. ISBN 978-0-387-97245-9. OCLC 21195908.
- Edwards, Robert E. (1995). Functional Analysis: Theory and Applications. New York: Dover Publications. ISBN 978-0-486-68143-6. OCLC 30593138.
- Grothendieck, Alexander (1973). Topological Vector Spaces. Translated by Chaljub, Orlando. New York: Gordon and Breach Science Publishers. ISBN 978-0-677-30020-7. OCLC 886098.
- Husain, Taqdir; Khaleelulla, S. M. (1978). Barrelledness in Topological and Ordered Vector Spaces. Lecture Notes in Mathematics. Vol. 692. Berlin, New York, Heidelberg: Springer-Verlag. ISBN 978-3-540-09096-0. OCLC 4493665.
- Jarchow, Hans (1981). Locally convex spaces. Stuttgart: B.G. Teubner. ISBN 978-3-519-02224-4. OCLC 8210342.
- Khaleelulla, S. M. (1982). Counterexamples in Topological Vector Spaces. Lecture Notes in Mathematics. Vol. 936. Berlin, Heidelberg, New York: Springer-Verlag. ISBN 978-3-540-11565-6. OCLC 8588370.
- Köthe, Gottfried (1983) [1969]. Topological Vector Spaces I. Grundlehren der mathematischen Wissenschaften. Vol. 159. Translated by Garling, D.J.H. New York: Springer Science & Business Media. ISBN 978-3-642-64988-2. MR 0248498. OCLC 840293704.
- Narici, Lawrence; Beckenstein, Edward (2011). Topological Vector Spaces. Pure and applied mathematics (Second ed.). Boca Raton, FL: CRC Press. ISBN 978-1584888666. OCLC 144216834.
- Osborne, Mason Scott (2013). Locally Convex Spaces. Graduate Texts in Mathematics. Vol. 269. Cham Heidelberg New York Dordrecht London: Springer Science & Business Media. ISBN 978-3-319-02045-7. OCLC 865578438.
- Robertson, Alex P.; Robertson, Wendy J. (1980). Topological Vector Spaces. Cambridge Tracts in Mathematics. Vol. 53. Cambridge England: Cambridge University Press. ISBN 978-0-521-29882-7. OCLC 589250.
- Robertson, Alex P.; Robertson, Wendy J. (1964). Topological vector spaces. Cambridge Tracts in Mathematics. Vol. 53. Cambridge University Press. pp. 65–75.
- Schaefer, Helmut H.; Wolff, Manfred P. (1999). Topological Vector Spaces. GTM. Vol. 8 (Second ed.). New York, NY: Springer New York Imprint Springer. ISBN 978-1-4612-7155-0. OCLC 840278135.
- Schechter, Eric (1996). Handbook of Analysis and Its Foundations. San Diego, CA: Academic Press. ISBN 978-0-12-622760-4. OCLC 175294365.
- Swartz, Charles (1992). An introduction to Functional Analysis. New York: M. Dekker. ISBN 978-0-8247-8643-4. OCLC 24909067.
- Trèves, François (2006) [1967]. Topological Vector Spaces, Distributions and Kernels. Mineola, N.Y.: Dover Publications. ISBN 978-0-486-45352-1. OCLC 853623322.
- Voigt, Jürgen (2020). A Course on Topological Vector Spaces. Compact Textbooks in Mathematics. Cham: Birkhäuser Basel. ISBN 978-3-030-32945-7. OCLC 1145563701.
- Wilansky, Albert (2013). Modern Methods in Topological Vector Spaces. Mineola, New York: Dover Publications, Inc. ISBN 978-0-486-49353-4. OCLC 849801114.
