= Barrelled set =

In functional analysis, a subset of a topological vector space (TVS) is called a barrel or a barrelled set if it is closed, convex, balanced, and absorbing.

Barrelled sets play an important role in the definitions of several classes of topological vector spaces, such as barrelled spaces.

== Definitions ==
Let $X$ be a topological vector space (TVS). A subset of $X$ is called a barrel if it is closed convex balanced and absorbing in $X.$ A subset of $X$ is called bornivorous and a bornivore if it absorbs every bounded subset of $X.$ Every bornivorous subset of $X$ is necessarily an absorbing subset of $X.$

Let $B_0 \subseteq X$ be a subset of a topological vector space $X.$ If $B_0$ is a balanced absorbing subset of $X$ and if there exists a sequence $\left(B_i\right)_{i=1}^{\infty}$ of balanced absorbing subsets of $X$ such that $B_{i+1} + B_{i+1} \subseteq B_i$ for all $i = 0, 1, \ldots,$ then $B_0$ is called a suprabarrel in $X,$ where moreover, $B_0$ is said to be a(n):

- bornivorous suprabarrel if in addition every $B_i$ is a closed and bornivorous subset of $X$ for every $i \geq 0.$
- ultrabarrel if in addition every $B_i$ is a closed subset of $X$ for every $i \geq 0.$
- bornivorous ultrabarrel if in addition every $B_i$ is a closed and bornivorous subset of $X$ for every $i \geq 0.$

In this case, $\left(B_i\right)_{i=1}^{\infty}$ is called a defining sequence for $B_0.$

== Properties ==
Note that every bornivorous ultrabarrel is an ultrabarrel and that every bornivorous suprabarrel is a suprabarrel.

== Examples ==
- In a semi normed vector space the closed unit ball is a barrel.
- Every locally convex topological vector space has a neighbourhood basis consisting of barrelled sets, although the space itself need not be a barreled space.

== See also ==
- Barrelled space – Type of topological vector space
- Space of linear maps
- Ultrabarrelled space

== Bibliography ==
- Hogbe-Nlend, Henri (1977). Bornologies and functional analysis. Amsterdam: North-Holland Publishing Co. pp. xii+144. ISBN 0-7204-0712-5. MR 0500064.
- Khaleelulla, S. M. (1982). Counterexamples in Topological Vector Spaces. Lecture Notes in Mathematics. Vol. 936. Berlin, Heidelberg, New York: Springer-Verlag. ISBN 978-3-540-11565-6. OCLC 8588370.
- Narici, Lawrence; Beckenstein, Edward (2011). Topological Vector Spaces. Pure and applied mathematics (Second ed.). Boca Raton, FL: CRC Press. ISBN 978-1584888666. OCLC 144216834.
- H.H. Schaefer (1970). Topological Vector Spaces. GTM. Vol. 3. Springer-Verlag. ISBN 0-387-05380-8.
- Khaleelulla, S.M. (1982). Counterexamples in Topological Vector Spaces. GTM. Vol. 936. Berlin Heidelberg: Springer-Verlag. pp. 29–33, 49, 104. ISBN 9783540115656.
- Kriegl, Andreas; Michor, Peter W. (1997). The Convenient Setting of Global Analysis. Mathematical Surveys and Monographs. American Mathematical Society. ISBN 9780821807804.
