= Equivalence of metrics =

Mathematical notion

In mathematics, two metrics on the same underlying set are said to be equivalent if the resulting metric spaces share certain properties. This notion generalizes equivalence of norms to arbitrary metric spaces.

Throughout the article, $X$ will denote a non-empty set and $d_1$ and $d_2$ will denote two metrics on $X$.

== Topological equivalence ==
The two metrics $d_1$ and $d_2$ are said to be topologically equivalent if they generate the same topology on $X$. The adverb topologically is often dropped. There are multiple ways of expressing this condition:

- a subset $A \subseteq X$ is $d_1$-open if and only if it is $d_2$-open;
- the open balls "nest": for any point $x \in X$ and any radius $r > 0$, there exist radii $r', r'' > 0$ such that
  $$B_{r'} (x; d_1) \subseteq B_r (x; d_2) \text{ and } B_{r''} (x; d_2) \subseteq B_r (x; d_1).$$
- the identity function $I : (X,d_1) \to (X,d_2)$ is continuous with continuous inverse; that is, it is a homeomorphism.

The following are sufficient but not necessary conditions for topological equivalence:

- there exists a strictly increasing, continuous, and subadditive $f: \R \to \R_+$ such that $d_2 = f \circ d_1$.
- for each $x \in X$, there exist positive constants $\alpha$ and $\beta$ such that, for every point $y \in X$,
  $$\alpha d_1 (x, y) \leq d_2 (x, y) \leq \beta d_1 (x, y).$$

== Strong equivalence ==
Two metrics $d_1$ and $d_2$ on X are strongly or bilipschitz equivalent (sometimes also uniformly equivalent although that's misleading; see example below), if and only if there exist positive constants $\alpha$ and $\beta$ such that, for every $x,y\in X$,

$$\alpha d_1(x,y) \leq d_2(x,y) \leq \beta d_1 (x, y).$$

In contrast to the sufficient condition for topological equivalence listed above, strong equivalence requires that there is a single set of constants that holds for every pair of points in $X$, rather than potentially different constants associated with each point of $X$.

Strong equivalence of two metrics implies topological equivalence, but not vice versa. For example, the metrics $d_1(x,y)=|x-y|$ and $d_2(x,y)=|\tan(x)-\tan(y)|$ on the interval $\left(-\frac{\pi}{2},\frac{\pi}{2}\right)$ are topologically equivalent, but not strongly equivalent. In fact, this interval is bounded under one of these metrics but not the other. On the other hand, strong equivalences always take bounded sets to bounded sets.

== Equivalence of metrics from perspective of categories ==
If $\mathcal{C}$ is a category whose objects are all metric spaces and morphisms are some continuous maps (i.e. a wide subcategory of Top), we can say that metrics $d_1, d_2$ are $\mathcal{C}$-equivalent if the identity function $I:(X, d_1)\to (X, d_2)$ is an isomorphism of $\mathcal{C}$.

Topological equivalence of metrics is obtained by taking morphisms of $\mathcal{C}$ to be all continuous maps, and strong equivalence is obtained by taking all Lipschitz maps. If the morphisms are taken to be non-expansive maps or isometries, then $d_1, d_2$ are equivalent if and only if $d_1 = d_2$. Other examples include to take morphisms to be all similarities, so that $d_1(x, y) = c\cdot d_2(x, y)$ for some $c > 0$, or all uniformly continuous maps, obtaining uniform equivalence. Uniformly equivalent metrics in this sense do not need to be strongly equivalent. For example, if $X = [0, 1], d_1(x, y) = |x-y|, d_2(x, y) = |x^2-y^2|$, then $d_1, d_2$ are uniformly but not strongly equivalent.

== Relation with equivalence of norms ==
When X is a vector space and the two metrics $d_1$ and $d_2$ are those induced by norms $\|\cdot \|_A$ and $\|\cdot\|_B$, respectively, then strong equivalence is equivalent to the condition that, for all $x \in X$,
$$\alpha\|x\|_A \leq \|x\|_B \leq \beta\|x\|_A$$
For linear operators between normed vector spaces, Lipschitz continuity is equivalent to continuity—an operator satisfying either of these conditions is called bounded. Therefore, in this case, $d_1$ and $d_2$ are topologically equivalent if and only if they are strongly equivalent; the norms $\|\cdot \|_A$ and $\|\cdot\|_B$ are simply said to be equivalent.

In finite dimensional vector spaces, all metrics induced by a norm, including the euclidean metric, the taxicab metric, and the Chebyshev distance, are equivalent.

== Properties preserved by equivalence ==
- The continuity of a function is preserved if either the domain or range is remetrized by an equivalent metric, but uniform continuity is preserved only by strongly equivalent metrics.
- The differentiability of a function $f:U\to V$, for $V$ a normed space and $U$ a subset of a normed space, is preserved if either the domain or range is renormed by an equivalent norm.
- A metric that is strongly equivalent to a complete metric is also complete; the same is not true of equivalent metrics because homeomorphisms do not preserve completeness. For example, since $(0,1)$ and $\mathbb R$ are homeomorphic, the homeomorphism induces a metric on $(0,1)$ which is complete because $\mathbb R$ is, and generates the same topology as the usual one, yet $(0,1)$ with the usual metric is not complete, because the sequence $(2^{-n})_{n\in\mathbb N}$ is Cauchy but not convergent. (It is not Cauchy in the induced metric.)

== See also ==
- Equivalence (measure theory)
