= Infrabarrelled space =

In functional analysis, a discipline within mathematics, a locally convex topological vector space (TVS) is said to be infrabarrelled (also spelled infrabarreled) if every bounded barrel is a neighborhood of the origin.

Similarly, quasibarrelled spaces are topological vector spaces (TVS) for which every bornivorous barrelled set in the space is a neighbourhood of the origin. Quasibarrelled spaces are studied because they are a weakening of the defining condition of barrelled spaces, for which a form of the Banach–Steinhaus theorem holds.

== Definition ==
A subset $B$ of a topological vector space (TVS) $X$ is called bornivorous if it absorbs all bounded subsets of $X$; that is, if for each bounded subset $S$ of $X,$ there exists some scalar $r$ such that $S \subseteq r B.$ A barrelled set or a barrel in a TVS is a set which is convex, balanced, absorbing and closed. A quasibarrelled space is a TVS for which every bornivorous barrelled set in the space is a neighbourhood of the origin.

== Characterizations ==
If $X$ is a Hausdorff locally convex space then the canonical injection from $X$ into its bidual is a topological embedding if and only if $X$ is infrabarrelled.

A Hausdorff topological vector space $X$ is quasibarrelled if and only if every bounded closed linear operator from $X$ into a complete metrizable TVS is continuous. By definition, a linear $F : X \to Y$ operator is called closed if its graph is a closed subset of $X \times Y.$

For a locally convex space $X$ with continuous dual $X^{\prime}$ the following are equivalent:

1. $X$ is quasibarrelled.
2. Every bounded lower semi-continuous semi-norm on $X$ is continuous.
3. Every $\beta(X', X)$-bounded subset of the continuous dual space $X^{\prime}$ is equicontinuous.

If $X$ is a metrizable locally convex TVS then the following are equivalent:

1. The strong dual of $X$ is quasibarrelled.
2. The strong dual of $X$ is barrelled.
3. The strong dual of $X$ is bornological.

== Properties ==
Every quasi-complete infrabarrelled space is barrelled.

A locally convex Hausdorff quasibarrelled space that is sequentially complete is barrelled.

A locally convex Hausdorff quasibarrelled space is a Mackey space, quasi-M-barrelled, and countably quasibarrelled.

A locally convex quasibarrelled space that is also a σ-barrelled space is necessarily a barrelled space.

A locally convex space is reflexive if and only if it is semireflexive and quasibarrelled.

== Examples ==
Every barrelled space is infrabarrelled. A closed vector subspace of an infrabarrelled space is, however, not necessarily infrabarrelled.

Every product and locally convex direct sum of any family of infrabarrelled spaces is infrabarrelled. Every separated quotient of an infrabarrelled space is infrabarrelled.

Every Hausdorff barrelled space and every Hausdorff bornological space is quasibarrelled. Thus, every metrizable TVS is quasibarrelled.

Note that there exist quasibarrelled spaces that are neither barrelled nor bornological. There exist Mackey spaces that are not quasibarrelled. There exist distinguished spaces, DF-spaces, and $\sigma$-barrelled spaces that are not quasibarrelled.

The strong dual space $X_b^{\prime}$ of a Fréchet space $X$ is distinguished if and only if $X$ is quasibarrelled.

=== Counter-examples ===
There exists a DF-space that is not quasibarrelled.

There exists a quasibarrelled DF-space that is not bornological.

There exists a quasibarrelled space that is not a σ-barrelled space.

== See also ==
- Barrelled space – Type of topological vector space
- Reflexive space – Locally convex topological vector space
- Semi-reflexive space

== Bibliography ==
- Adasch, Norbert; Ernst, Bruno; Keim, Dieter (1978). Topological Vector Spaces: The Theory Without Convexity Conditions. Lecture Notes in Mathematics. Vol. 639. Berlin New York: Springer-Verlag. ISBN 978-3-540-08662-8. OCLC 297140003.
- Berberian, Sterling K. (1974). Lectures in Functional Analysis and Operator Theory. Graduate Texts in Mathematics. Vol. 15. New York: Springer. ISBN 978-0-387-90081-0. OCLC 878109401.
- Bourbaki, Nicolas (1987) [1981]. Topological Vector Spaces: Chapters 1–5. Éléments de mathématique. Translated by Eggleston, H.G.; Madan, S. Berlin New York: Springer-Verlag. ISBN 3-540-13627-4. OCLC 17499190.
- Conway, John B. (1990). A Course in Functional Analysis. Graduate Texts in Mathematics. Vol. 96 (2nd ed.). New York: Springer-Verlag. ISBN 978-0-387-97245-9. OCLC 21195908.
- Edwards, Robert E. (1995). Functional Analysis: Theory and Applications. New York: Dover Publications. ISBN 978-0-486-68143-6. OCLC 30593138.
- Grothendieck, Alexander (1973). Topological Vector Spaces. Translated by Chaljub, Orlando. New York: Gordon and Breach Science Publishers. ISBN 978-0-677-30020-7. OCLC 886098.
- Hogbe-Nlend, Henri (1977). Bornologies and Functional Analysis: Introductory Course on the Theory of Duality Topology-Bornology and its use in Functional Analysis. North-Holland Mathematics Studies. Vol. 26. Amsterdam New York New York: North Holland. ISBN 978-0-08-087137-0. MR 0500064. OCLC 316549583.
- Husain, Taqdir; Khaleelulla, S. M. (1978). Barrelledness in Topological and Ordered Vector Spaces. Lecture Notes in Mathematics. Vol. 692. Berlin, New York, Heidelberg: Springer-Verlag. ISBN 978-3-540-09096-0. OCLC 4493665.
- Jarchow, Hans (1981). Locally convex spaces. Stuttgart: B.G. Teubner. ISBN 978-3-519-02224-4. OCLC 8210342.
- Khaleelulla, S. M. (1982). Counterexamples in Topological Vector Spaces. Lecture Notes in Mathematics. Vol. 936. Berlin, Heidelberg, New York: Springer-Verlag. ISBN 978-3-540-11565-6. OCLC 8588370.
- Köthe, Gottfried (1983) [1969]. Topological Vector Spaces I. Grundlehren der mathematischen Wissenschaften. Vol. 159. Translated by Garling, D.J.H. New York: Springer Science & Business Media. ISBN 978-3-642-64988-2. MR 0248498. OCLC 840293704.
- Köthe, Gottfried (1979). Topological Vector Spaces II. Grundlehren der mathematischen Wissenschaften. Vol. 237. New York: Springer Science & Business Media. ISBN 978-0-387-90400-9. OCLC 180577972.
- Narici, Lawrence; Beckenstein, Edward (2011). Topological Vector Spaces. Pure and applied mathematics (Second ed.). Boca Raton, FL: CRC Press. ISBN 978-1584888666. OCLC 144216834.
- Schaefer, Helmut H.; Wolff, Manfred P. (1999). Topological Vector Spaces. GTM. Vol. 8 (Second ed.). New York, NY: Springer New York Imprint Springer. ISBN 978-1-4612-7155-0. OCLC 840278135.
- Swartz, Charles (1992). An introduction to Functional Analysis. New York: M. Dekker. ISBN 978-0-8247-8643-4. OCLC 24909067.
- Trèves, François (2006) [1967]. Topological Vector Spaces, Distributions and Kernels. Mineola, N.Y.: Dover Publications. ISBN 978-0-486-45352-1. OCLC 853623322.
- Wilansky, Albert (2013). Modern Methods in Topological Vector Spaces. Mineola, New York: Dover Publications, Inc. ISBN 978-0-486-49353-4. OCLC 849801114.
- Wong, Yau-Chuen (1979). Schwartz Spaces, Nuclear Spaces, and Tensor Products. Lecture Notes in Mathematics. Vol. 726. Berlin New York: Springer-Verlag. ISBN 978-3-540-09513-2. OCLC 5126158.
