= Quasi-complete space =

Topological vector space in which every closed and bounded subset is complete

In functional analysis, a topological vector space (TVS) is said to be quasi-complete or boundedly complete if every closed and bounded subset is complete. This concept is of considerable importance for non-metrizable TVSs.

== Properties ==
- Every quasi-complete TVS is sequentially complete.
- In a quasi-complete locally convex space, the closure of the convex hull of a compact subset is again compact.
- In a quasi-complete Hausdorff TVS, every precompact subset is relatively compact.
- If X is a normed space and Y is a quasi-complete locally convex TVS then the set of all compact linear maps of X into Y is a closed vector subspace of $L_b(X;Y)$.
- Every quasi-complete infrabarrelled space is barreled.
- If X is a quasi-complete locally convex space then every weakly bounded subset of the continuous dual space is strongly bounded.
- A quasi-complete nuclear space then X has the Heine–Borel property.

== Examples and sufficient conditions ==
Every complete TVS is quasi-complete. The product of any collection of quasi-complete spaces is again quasi-complete. The projective limit of any collection of quasi-complete spaces is again quasi-complete. Every semi-reflexive space is quasi-complete.

The quotient of a quasi-complete space by a closed vector subspace may fail to be quasi-complete.

=== Counter-examples ===
There exists an LB-space that is not quasi-complete.

== See also ==
- Complete topological vector space – Structure in functional analysis
- Complete uniform space – Topological space with a notion of uniform properties

== Bibliography ==
- Khaleelulla, S. M. (1982). Counterexamples in Topological Vector Spaces. Lecture Notes in Mathematics. Vol. 936. Berlin, Heidelberg, New York: Springer-Verlag. ISBN 978-3-540-11565-6. OCLC 8588370.
- Narici, Lawrence; Beckenstein, Edward (2011). Topological Vector Spaces. Pure and applied mathematics (Second ed.). Boca Raton, FL: CRC Press. ISBN 978-1584888666. OCLC 144216834.
- Schaefer, Helmut H.; Wolff, Manfred P. (1999). Topological Vector Spaces. GTM. Vol. 8 (Second ed.). New York, NY: Springer New York Imprint Springer. ISBN 978-1-4612-7155-0. OCLC 840278135.
- Trèves, François (2006) [1967]. Topological Vector Spaces, Distributions and Kernels. Mineola, N.Y.: Dover Publications. ISBN 978-0-486-45352-1. OCLC 853623322.
- Wilansky, Albert (2013). Modern Methods in Topological Vector Spaces. Mineola, New York: Dover Publications, Inc. ISBN 978-0-486-49353-4. OCLC 849801114.
- Wong, Yau-Chuen (1979). Schwartz Spaces, Nuclear Spaces, and Tensor Products. Lecture Notes in Mathematics. Vol. 726. Berlin New York: Springer-Verlag. ISBN 978-3-540-09513-2. OCLC 5126158.
