= Mackey space =

Mathematics concept

In mathematics, particularly in functional analysis, a Mackey space is a locally convex topological vector space X such that the topology of X coincides with the Mackey topology τ(X,X′), the finest topology which still preserves the continuous dual. They are named after George Mackey.

== Examples ==
Examples of locally convex spaces that are Mackey spaces include:

- All barrelled spaces and more generally all infrabarreled spaces
  - Hence in particular all bornological spaces and reflexive spaces
- All metrizable spaces.
  - In particular, all Fréchet spaces, including all Banach spaces and specifically Hilbert spaces, are Mackey spaces.
- The product, locally convex direct sum, and the inductive limit of a family of Mackey spaces is a Mackey space.

== Properties ==
- A locally convex space $X$ with continuous dual $X'$ is a Mackey space if and only if each convex and $\sigma(X', X)$-relatively compact subset of $X'$ is equicontinuous.
- The completion of a Mackey space is again a Mackey space.
- A separated quotient of a Mackey space is again a Mackey space.
- A Mackey space need not be separable, complete, quasi-barrelled, nor $\sigma$-quasi-barrelled.

== See also ==
- Mackey topology
- Topologies on spaces of linear maps
