= Fréchet space =

Locally convex topological vector space that is also a complete metric space

In functional analysis and related areas of mathematics, Fréchet spaces, named after Maurice Fréchet, are special topological vector spaces. They are generalizations of Banach spaces (normed vector spaces that are complete with respect to the metric induced by the norm). All Banach and Hilbert spaces are Fréchet spaces. Spaces of infinitely differentiable functions are typical examples of Fréchet spaces, many of which are typically not Banach spaces.

A Fréchet space $X$ is defined to be a locally convex metrizable topological vector space (TVS) that is complete as a TVS, meaning that every Cauchy sequence in $X$ converges to some point in $X$ (see footnote for more details). (Note: Here "Cauchy" means Cauchy with respect to the canonical uniformity that every TVS possess. That is, a sequence $x_{\bull} = \left(x_m\right)_{m=1}^{\infty}$ in a TVS $X$ is Cauchy if and only if for all neighborhoods $U$ of the origin in $X,$ $x_m - x_n \in U$ whenever $m$ and $n$ are sufficiently large. Note that this definition of a Cauchy sequence does not depend on any particular metric and does not even require that $X$ be metrizable.)

Important note: Not all authors require that a Fréchet space be locally convex (discussed below).

The topology of every Fréchet space is induced by some translation-invariant complete metric. Conversely, if the topology of a locally convex space $X$ is induced by a translation-invariant complete metric then $X$ is a Fréchet space.

Fréchet was the first to use the term "Banach space" and Banach in turn then coined the term "Fréchet space" to mean a complete metrizable topological vector space, without the local convexity requirement (such a space is today often called an "F-space"). The local convexity requirement was added later by Nicolas Bourbaki. A sizable number of authors (e.g. Schaefer) use "F-space" to mean a (locally convex) Fréchet space while others do not require that a "Fréchet space" be locally convex. Moreover, some authors even use "F-space" and "Fréchet space" interchangeably. When reading mathematical literature, it is recommended that a reader always check whether the book's or article's definition of "F-space" and "Fréchet space" requires local convexity.

== Definitions ==
Fréchet spaces can be defined in two equivalent ways: the first employs a translation-invariant metric, the second a countable family of seminorms.

=== Invariant metric definition ===
A topological vector space $X$ is a Fréchet space if and only if it satisfies the following three properties:

1. It is locally convex. (Note: Some authors do not include local convexity as part of the definition of a Fréchet space.)
2. Its topology can be induced by a translation-invariant metric, that is, a metric $d : X \times X \to \R$ such that $d(x, y) = d(x + z, y + z)$ for all $x, y, z \in X.$ This means that a subset $U$ of $X$ is open if and only if for every $u \in U$ there exists an $r > 0$ such that $\{v : d(v, u) < r\}$ is a subset of $U.$
3. Some (or equivalently, every) translation-invariant metric on $X$ inducing the topology of $X$ is complete.
  - Assuming that the other two conditions are satisfied, this condition is equivalent to $X$ being a complete topological vector space, meaning that $X$ is a complete uniform space when it is endowed with its canonical uniformity (this canonical uniformity is independent of any metric on $X$ and is defined entirely in terms of vector subtraction and $X$'s neighborhoods of the origin; moreover, the uniformity induced by any (topology-defining) translation invariant metric on $X$ is identical to this canonical uniformity).

Note there is no natural notion of distance between two points of a Fréchet space: many different translation-invariant metrics may induce the same topology.

=== Countable family of seminorms definition ===
The alternative and somewhat more practical definition is the following: a topological vector space $X$ is a Fréchet space if and only if it satisfies the following three properties:

1. It is a Hausdorff space.
2. Its topology may be induced by a countable family of seminorms $(\|\cdot\|_k)_{k \in \N_0}$. This means that a subset $U \subseteq X$ is open if and only if for every $u \in U$ there exist $K \geq 0$ and $r > 0$ such that $\{ v \in X : \|v-u\|_k < r \text{ for all } k \le K\}$ is a subset of $U$.
3. It is complete with respect to the family of seminorms.

A family $\mathcal P$ of seminorms on $X$ yields a Hausdorff topology if and only if
$$\bigcap_{\|\cdot\| \in \mathcal{P}} \{x \in X : \|x\| = 0\} = \{0\}.$$

A sequence $\left(x_n\right)_{n \in \N}$ in $X$ converges to $x$ in the Fréchet space defined by a family of seminorms if and only if it converges to $x$ with respect to each of the given seminorms.

=== As webbed Baire spaces ===
Theorem (de Wilde 1978)—A topological vector space $X$ is a Fréchet space if and only if it is both a webbed space and a Baire space.

=== Comparison to Banach spaces ===
In contrast to Banach spaces, the complete translation-invariant metric need not arise from a norm. The topology of a Fréchet space does, however, arise from both a total paranorm and an F-norm (the F stands for Fréchet).

Even though the topological structure of Fréchet spaces is more complicated than that of Banach spaces due to the potential lack of a norm, many important results in functional analysis, like the open mapping theorem, the closed graph theorem, and the Banach–Steinhaus theorem, still hold.

== Constructing Fréchet spaces ==
Recall that a seminorm $\|\cdot\|$ is a function from a vector space $X$ to the real numbers satisfying three properties. For all $x, y \in X$ and all scalars $c,$
$$\|x\| \geq 0$$
$$\|x+y\| \le \|x\| + \|y\|$$
$$\|c\cdot x\| = |c|\|x\|$$

If $\| x\| = 0 \iff x = 0$, then $\|\cdot\|$ is in fact a norm. However, seminorms are useful in that they enable us to construct Fréchet spaces, as follows:

To construct a Fréchet space, one typically starts with a vector space $X$ and defines a countable family of seminorms $\|\cdot\|_k$ on $X$ with the following two properties:

- if $x \in X$ and $\|x\|_k = 0$ for all $k \geq 0,$ then $x = 0$;
- if $x_{\bull} = \left(x_n\right)_{n=1}^{\infty}$ is a sequence in $X$ which is Cauchy with respect to each seminorm $\|\cdot\|_k,$ then there exists $x \in X$ such that $x_{\bull} = \left(x_n\right)_{n=1}^{\infty}$ converges to $x$ with respect to each seminorm $\|\cdot\|_k.$

Then the topology induced by these seminorms (as explained above) turns $X$ into a Fréchet space; the first property ensures that it is Hausdorff, and the second property ensures that it is complete. A translation-invariant complete metric inducing the same topology on $X$ can then be defined by
$$d(x,y)=\sum_{k=0}^\infty 2^{-k}\frac{\|x-y\|_k}{1+\|x-y\|_k} \qquad x, y \in X.$$

The function $u \mapsto \frac{u}{1 + u}$ maps $[0, \infty)$ monotonically to $[0, 1),$ and so the above definition ensures that $d(x, y)$ is "small" if and only if there exists $K$ "large" such that $\|x - y\|_k$ is "small" for $k = 0, \ldots, K.$

== Examples ==
=== From pure functional analysis ===
- Every Banach space is a Fréchet space, as the norm induces a translation-invariant metric and the space is complete with respect to this metric.
- The space $\R^{\omega}$ of all real valued sequences (also denoted $\R^{\N}$) becomes a Fréchet space if we define the $k$-th seminorm of a sequence to be the absolute value of the $k$-th element of the sequence. Convergence in this Fréchet space is equivalent to element-wise convergence.

=== From smooth manifolds ===
- The vector space $C^\infty([0,1])$ of all infinitely differentiable functions $f : [0,1] \to \R$ becomes a Fréchet space with the seminorms

$$\|f\|_k = \sup\{|f^{(k)}(x)| : x \in [0,1]\}$$
for every non-negative integer $k.$ Here, $f^{(k)}$ denotes the $k$-th derivative of $f,$ and $f^{(0)} = f.$ In this Fréchet space, a sequence $\left(f_n\right) \to f$ of functions converges towards the element $f \in C^\infty([0,1])$ if and only if for every non-negative integer $k \geq 0,$ the sequence $\left(f_n^{(k)}\right) \to f^{(k)}$ converges uniformly.

- The vector space $C^\infty(\R)$ of all infinitely differentiable functions $f : \R \to \R$ becomes a Fréchet space with the seminorms

$$\|f\|_{k, a} = \sup \{ |f^{(k)}(x)| : x \in [-a, a]\}$$
for all integers $k, a \geq 0.$ Then, a sequence of functions $\left(f_n\right) \to f$ converges if and only if for every $k \geq 0,$ the sequence $\left(f_n^{(k)}\right) \to f^{(k)}$ converges compactly.

- The vector space $C^m(\R)$ of all $m$-times continuously differentiable functions $f : \R \to \R$ becomes a Fréchet space with the seminorms

$$\|f\|_{k, a} = \sup \{ |f^{(k)}(x)| : x \in [-a, a]\}$$
for all integers $a \geq 0$ and $k = 0, \ldots, m.$

- If $M$ is a compact $C^{\infty}$-manifold and $B$ is a Banach space, then the set $C^{\infty}(M, B)$ of all infinitely-often differentiable functions $f : M \to B$ can be turned into a Fréchet space by using as seminorms the suprema of the norms of all partial derivatives. If $M$ is a (not necessarily compact) $C^{\infty}$-manifold which admits a countable sequence $K^n$ of compact subsets, so that every compact subset of $M$ is contained in at least one $K^n,$ then the spaces $C^m(M, B)$ and $C^{\infty}(M, B)$ are also Fréchet space in a natural manner.
  As a special case, every smooth finite-dimensional complete manifold $M$ can be made into such a nested union of compact subsets: equip it with a Riemannian metric $g$ which induces a metric $d(x, y),$ choose $x \in M,$ and let

$$K_n = \{y \in M : d(x,y) \le n\} \ .$$

- Let $X$ be a compact $C^{\infty}$-manifold and$V$ a vector bundle over $X.$ Let $C^{\infty}(X, V)$ denote the space of smooth sections of $V$ over $X.$ Choose Riemannian metrics $g$ and connections $D$, which are guaranteed to exist, on the bundles $TX$ and $V.$ If $s$ is a section, denote its j^{th} covariant derivative by $D^j s.$ Then

$$\|s\|_n = \sum_{j=0}^n \sup_{x\in M} |D^js|_g$$
(where $|\,\cdot\,|_g$ is the norm induced by the Riemannian metric $g$) is a family of seminorms making $C^{\infty}(M, V)$ into a Fréchet space.

=== From holomorphicity ===
- Let $H$ be the space of entire (everywhere holomorphic) functions on the complex plane. Then the family of seminorms

$$\left|f\right|_{n} = \sup \{\left|f(z)\right| : |z| \leq n\}$$
makes $H$ into a Fréchet space.

- Let $H$ be the space of entire (everywhere holomorphic) functions of exponential type $\tau.$ Then the family of seminorms

$$\left|f\right|_{n} = \sup_{z \in \Complex} \exp \left[- \left(\tau + \frac{1}{n} \right) |z|\right] \left|f(z)\right|$$
makes $H$ into a Fréchet space.

Not all vector spaces with complete translation-invariant metrics are Fréchet spaces. An example is the space $L^p([0, 1])$ with $p < 1.$ Although this space fails to be locally convex, it is an F-space.

== Properties and further notions ==
If a Fréchet space admits a continuous norm then all of the seminorms used to define it can be replaced with norms by adding this continuous norm to each of them. A Banach space, $C^{\infty}([a, b]),$ $C^{\infty}(X, V)$ with $X$ compact, and $H$ all admit norms, while $\R^{\omega}$ and $C(\R)$ do not.

A closed subspace of a Fréchet space is a Fréchet space. A quotient of a Fréchet space by a closed subspace is a Fréchet space. The direct sum of a finite number of Fréchet spaces is a Fréchet space.

A product of countably many Fréchet spaces is always once again a Fréchet space. However, an arbitrary product of Fréchet spaces will be a Fréchet space if and only if all except for at most countably many of them are trivial (that is, have dimension 0). Consequently, a product of uncountably many non-trivial Fréchet spaces can not be a Fréchet space (indeed, such a product is not even metrizable because its origin can not have a countable neighborhood basis). So for example, if $I \neq \varnothing$ is any set and $X$ is any non-trivial Fréchet space (such as $X = \R$ for instance), then the product $X^I = \prod_{i \in I} X$ is a Fréchet space if and only if $I$ is a countable set.

Several important tools of functional analysis which are based on the Baire category theorem remain true in Fréchet spaces; examples are the closed graph theorem and the open mapping theorem. The open mapping theorem implies that if $\tau \text{ and } \tau_2$ are topologies on $X$ that make both $(X, \tau)$ and $\left(X, \tau_2\right)$ into complete metrizable TVSs (such as Fréchet spaces) and if one topology is finer or coarser than the other then they must be equal (that is, if $\tau \subseteq \tau_2 \text{ or } \tau_2 \subseteq \tau \text{ then } \tau = \tau_2$).

Every bounded linear operator from a Fréchet space into another topological vector space (TVS) is continuous.

There exists a Fréchet space $X$ having a bounded subset $B$ and also a dense vector subspace $M$ such that $B$ is not contained in the closure (in $X$) of any bounded subset of $M.$

All Fréchet spaces are stereotype spaces. In the theory of stereotype spaces Fréchet spaces are dual objects to Brauner spaces. All metrizable Montel spaces are separable. A separable Fréchet space is a Montel space if and only if each weak-* convergent sequence in its continuous dual converges is strongly convergent.

The strong dual space $X_b^{\prime}$ of a Fréchet space (and more generally, of any metrizable locally convex space) $X$ is a DF-space. The strong dual of a DF-space is a Fréchet space. The strong dual of a reflexive Fréchet space is a bornological space and a Ptak space. Every Fréchet space is a Ptak space. The strong bidual (that is, the strong dual space of the strong dual space) of a metrizable locally convex space is a Fréchet space.

=== Norms and normability ===
If $X$ is a locally convex space then the topology of $X$ can be a defined by a family of continuous norms on $X$ (a norm is a positive-definite seminorm) if and only if there exists at least one continuous norm on $X.$ Even if a Fréchet space has a topology that is defined by a (countable) family of norms (all norms are also seminorms), then it may nevertheless still fail to be normable space (meaning that its topology cannot be defined by any single norm). The space of all sequences $\mathbb{K}^{\N}$ (with the product topology) is a Fréchet space. There does not exist any Hausdorff locally convex topology on $\mathbb{K}^{\N}$ that is strictly coarser than this product topology. The space $\mathbb{K}^{\N}$ is not normable, which means that its topology can not be defined by any norm. Also, there does not exist any continuous norm on $\mathbb{K}^{\N}.$ In fact, as the following theorem shows, whenever $X$ is a Fréchet space on which there does not exist any continuous norm, then this is due entirely to the presence of $\mathbb{K}^{\N}$ as a subspace.

Theorem—Let $X$ be a Fréchet space over the field $\mathbb{K}.$ Then the following are equivalent:

1. $X$ does not admit a continuous norm (that is, any continuous seminorm on $X$ can not be a norm).
2. $X$ contains a vector subspace that is TVS-isomorphic to $\mathbb{K}^{\N}.$
3. $X$ contains a complemented vector subspace that is TVS-isomorphic to $\mathbb{K}^{\N}.$

If $X$ is a non-normable Fréchet space on which there exists a continuous norm, then $X$ contains a closed vector subspace that has no topological complement.

A metrizable locally convex space is normable if and only if its strong dual space is a Fréchet–Urysohn locally convex space. In particular, if a locally convex metrizable space $X$ (such as a Fréchet space) is not normable (which can only happen if $X$ is infinite dimensional) then its strong dual space $X^{\prime}_b$ is not a Fréchet–Urysohn space and consequently, this complete Hausdorff locally convex space $X^{\prime}_b$ is also neither metrizable nor normable.

The strong dual space of a Fréchet space (and more generally, of bornological spaces such as metrizable TVSs) is always a complete TVS and so like any complete TVS, it is normable if and only if its topology can be induced by a complete norm (that is, if and only if it can be made into a Banach space that has the same topology). If $X$ is a Fréchet space then $X$ is normable if (and only if) there exists a complete norm on its continuous dual space $X'$ such that the norm induced topology on $X'$ is finer than the weak-* topology. Consequently, if a Fréchet space is not normable (which can only happen if it is infinite dimensional) then neither is its strong dual space.

=== Anderson–Kadec theorem ===
Anderson–Kadec theorem—Every infinite-dimensional, separable real Fréchet space is homeomorphic to $\R^{\N},$ the Cartesian product of countably many copies of the real line $\R.$

Note that the homeomorphism described in the Anderson–Kadec theorem is not necessarily linear.

Eidelheit theorem—A Fréchet space is either isomorphic to a Banach space, or has a quotient space isomorphic to $\R^{\N}.$

== Differentiation of functions ==
If $X$ and $Y$ are Fréchet spaces, then the space $L(X,Y)$ consisting of all continuous linear maps from $X$ to $Y$ is not a Fréchet space in any natural manner. This is a major difference between the theory of Banach spaces and that of Fréchet spaces and necessitates a different definition for continuous differentiability of functions defined on Fréchet spaces, the Gateaux derivative:

Suppose $U$ is an open subset of a Fréchet space $X,$ $P : U \to Y$ is a function valued in a Fréchet space $Y,$ $x \in U$ and $h \in X.$ The map $P$ is differentiable at $x$ in the direction $h$ if the limit
$$D(P)(x)(h) = \lim_{t \to 0} \,\frac{1}{t}\left(P(x + th) - P(x)\right)$$
exists. The map $P$ is said to be continuously differentiable in $U$ if the map
$$D(P) : U \times X \to Y$$
is continuous. Since the product of Fréchet spaces is again a Fréchet space, we can then try to differentiate $D(P)$ and define the higher derivatives of $P$ in this fashion.

The derivative operator $P : C^{\infty}([0, 1]) \to C^{\infty}([0, 1])$ defined by $P(f) = f'$ is itself infinitely differentiable. The first derivative is given by
$$D(P)(f)(h) = h'$$
for any two elements $f, h \in C^{\infty}([0, 1]).$ This is a major advantage of the Fréchet space $C^{\infty}([0, 1])$ over the Banach space $C^k([0, 1])$ for finite $k.$

If $P : U \to Y$ is a continuously differentiable function, then the differential equation
$$x'(t) = P(x(t)),\quad x(0) = x_0\in U$$
need not have any solutions, and even if does, the solutions need not be unique. This is in stark contrast to the situation in Banach spaces.

In general, the inverse function theorem is not true in Fréchet spaces, although a partial substitute is the Nash–Moser theorem.

== Fréchet manifolds and Lie groups ==
One may define Fréchet manifolds as spaces that "locally look like" Fréchet spaces (just like ordinary manifolds are defined as spaces that locally look like Euclidean space $\R^n$), and one can then extend the concept of Lie group to these manifolds. This is useful because for a given (ordinary) compact $C^{\infty}$ manifold $M,$ the set of all $C^{\infty}$ diffeomorphisms $f : M \to M$ forms a generalized Lie group in this sense, and this Lie group captures the symmetries of $M.$ Some of the relations between Lie algebras and Lie groups remain valid in this setting.

Another important example of a Fréchet Lie group is the loop group of a compact Lie group $G,$ the smooth ($C^{\infty}$) mappings $\gamma : S^1 \to G,$ multiplied pointwise by $\left(\gamma_1 \gamma_2\right)(t) = \gamma_1(t) \gamma_2(t).$

== Generalizations ==
If we drop the requirement for the space to be locally convex, we obtain F-spaces: vector spaces with complete translation-invariant metrics.

LF-spaces are countable inductive limits of Fréchet spaces.

== See also ==
- Brauner space
- Fréchet lattice – Topological vector lattice
- Graded Fréchet space – Generalization of the inverse function theorem
- Surjection of Fréchet spaces – Characterization of surjectivity
- Tame Fréchet space – Generalization of the inverse function theorem
