= Annales de l'Institut Fourier =

- Discipline: Mathematics
- Language: English, French
- Edited by: Hervé Pajot

Publication details
- History: 1949–present
- Frequency: Bimonthly
- Impact factor: 0.823 (2019)

Standard abbreviations
- ISO 4: Ann. Inst. Fourier
- MathSciNet: Ann. Inst. Fourier (Grenoble)

Indexing
- CODEN: AIFUA7
- ISSN: 0373-0956 (print); 1777-5310 (web)

Links
- Journal homepage

The Annales de l'Institut Fourier (French pronunciation: [anal də lɛ̃stity fuʁje]) is a French mathematical journal publishing papers in all fields of mathematics. It was established in 1949. The journal publishes one volume per year, consisting of six issues. The current editor-in-chief is Hervé Pajot. Articles are published either in English or in French.

The journal is indexed in Mathematical Reviews, Zentralblatt MATH and the Web of Science. According to the Journal Citation Reports, the journal had a 2008 impact factor of 0.804.
