= Strong dual space =

Continuous dual space endowed with the topology of uniform convergence on bounded sets

In functional analysis and related areas of mathematics, the strong dual space of a topological vector space (TVS) $X$ is the continuous dual space $X^{\prime}$ of $X$ equipped with the strong (dual) topology or the topology of uniform convergence on bounded subsets of $X,$ where this topology is denoted by $b\left(X^{\prime}, X\right)$ or $\beta\left(X^{\prime}, X\right).$ The coarsest polar topology is called weak topology. The strong dual space plays such an important role in modern functional analysis, that the continuous dual space is usually assumed to have the strong dual topology unless indicated otherwise. To emphasize that the continuous dual space, $X^{\prime},$ has the strong dual topology, $X^{\prime}_b$ or $X^{\prime}_{\beta}$ may be written.

== Strong dual topology ==
Throughout, all vector spaces will be assumed to be over the field $\mathbb{F}$ of either the real numbers $\R$ or complex numbers $\C.$

=== Definition from a dual system ===
Let $(X, Y, \langle \cdot, \cdot \rangle)$ be a dual pair of vector spaces over the field $\mathbb{F}$ of real numbers $\R$ or complex numbers $\C.$ For any $B \subseteq X$ and any $y \in Y,$ define $|y|_B = \sup_{x \in B}|\langle x, y\rangle|.$

Neither $X$ nor $Y$ has a topology so say a subset $B \subseteq X$ is said to be bounded by a subset $C \subseteq Y$ if $|y|_B < \infty$ for all $y \in C.$ So a subset $B \subseteq X$ is called bounded if and only if $\sup_{x \in B} |\langle x, y \rangle| < \infty \quad \text{ for all } y \in Y.$ This is equivalent to the usual notion of bounded subsets when $X$ is given the weak topology induced by $Y,$ which is a Hausdorff locally convex topology.

Let $\mathcal{B}$ denote the family of all subsets $B \subseteq X$ bounded by elements of $Y$; that is, $\mathcal{B}$ is the set of all subsets $B \subseteq X$ such that for every $y \in Y,$ $|y|_B = \sup_{x\in B}|\langle x, y\rangle| < \infty.$ Then the strong topology $\beta(Y, X, \langle \cdot, \cdot \rangle)$ on $Y,$ also denoted by $b(Y, X, \langle \cdot, \cdot \rangle)$ or simply $\beta(Y, X)$ or $b(Y, X)$ if the pairing $\langle \cdot, \cdot\rangle$ is understood, is defined as the locally convex topology on $Y$ generated by the seminorms of the form $|y|_B = \sup_{x \in B} |\langle x, y\rangle|,\qquad y \in Y, \qquad B \in \mathcal{B}.$

The definition of the strong dual topology now proceeds as in the case of a TVS. Note that if $X$ is a TVS whose continuous dual space separates points on $X,$ then $X$ is part of a canonical dual system $\left(X, X^{\prime}, \langle \cdot , \cdot \rangle\right)$ where $\left\langle x, x^{\prime} \right\rangle := x^{\prime}(x).$ In the special case when $X$ is a locally convex space, the strong topology on the (continuous) dual space $X^{\prime}$ (that is, on the space of all continuous linear functionals $f : X \to \mathbb{F}$) is defined as the strong topology $\beta\left(X^{\prime}, X\right),$ and it coincides with the topology of uniform convergence on bounded sets in $X,$ i.e. with the topology on $X^{\prime}$ generated by the seminorms of the form $|f|_B = \sup_{x \in B} |f(x)|, \qquad \text{ where } f \in X^{\prime},$ where $B$ runs over the family of all bounded sets in $X.$ The space $X^{\prime}$ with this topology is called strong dual space of the space $X$ and is denoted by $X^{\prime}_{\beta}.$

=== Definition on a TVS ===
Suppose that $X$ is a topological vector space (TVS) over the field $\mathbb{F}.$ Let $\mathcal{B}$ be any fundamental system of bounded sets of $X$; that is, $\mathcal{B}$ is a family of bounded subsets of $X$ such that every bounded subset of $X$ is a subset of some $B \in \mathcal{B}$; the set of all bounded subsets of $X$ forms a fundamental system of bounded sets of $X.$ A basis of closed neighborhoods of the origin in $X^{\prime}$ is given by the polars: $B^{\circ} := \left\{ x^{\prime} \in X^{\prime} : \sup_{x \in B} \left|x^{\prime}(x)\right| \leq 1 \right\}$ as $B$ ranges over $\mathcal{B}$). This is a locally convex topology that is given by the set of seminorms on $X^{\prime}$: $\left|x^{\prime}\right|_{B} := \sup_{x \in B} \left|x^{\prime}(x)\right|$ as $B$ ranges over $\mathcal{B}.$

If $X$ is normable then so is $X^{\prime}_{b}$ and $X^{\prime}_{b}$ will in fact be a Banach space. If $X$ is a normed space with norm $\| \cdot \|$ then $X^{\prime}$ has a canonical norm (the operator norm) given by $\left\| x^{\prime} \right\| := \sup_{\| x \| \leq 1} \left| x^{\prime}(x) \right|$; the topology that this norm induces on $X^{\prime}$ is identical to the strong dual topology.

== Bidual ==
The bidual or second dual of a TVS $X,$ often denoted by $X^{\prime \prime},$ is the strong dual of the strong dual of $X$: $X^{\prime \prime} \,:=\, \left(X^{\prime}_b\right)^{\prime}$ where $X^{\prime}_b$ denotes $X^{\prime}$ endowed with the strong dual topology $b\left(X^{\prime}, X\right).$ Unless indicated otherwise, the vector space $X^{\prime \prime}$ is usually assumed to be endowed with the strong dual topology induced on it by $X^{\prime}_b,$ in which case it is called the strong bidual of $X$; that is, $X^{\prime \prime} \,:=\, \left(X^{\prime}_b\right)^{\prime}_b$ where the vector space $X^{\prime \prime}$ is endowed with the strong dual topology $b\left(X^{\prime\prime}, X^{\prime}_b\right).$

== Properties ==
Let $X$ be a locally convex TVS.

- A convex balanced weakly compact subset of $X^{\prime}$ is bounded in $X^{\prime}_b.$
- Every weakly bounded subset of $X^{\prime}$ is strongly bounded.
- If $X$ is a barreled space then $X$'s topology is identical to the strong dual topology $b\left(X, X^{\prime}\right)$ and to the Mackey topology on $X.$
- If $X$ is a metrizable locally convex space, then the strong dual of $X$ is a bornological space if and only if it is an infrabarreled space, if and only if it is a barreled space.
- If $X$ is Hausdorff locally convex TVS then $\left(X, b\left(X, X^{\prime}\right)\right)$ is metrizable if and only if there exists a countable set $\mathcal{B}$ of bounded subsets of $X$ such that every bounded subset of $X$ is contained in some element of $\mathcal{B}.$
- If $X$ is locally convex, then this topology is finer than all other $\mathcal{G}$-topologies on $X^{\prime}$ when considering only $\mathcal{G}$'s whose sets are subsets of $X.$
- If $X$ is a bornological space (e.g. metrizable or LF-space) then $X^{\prime}_{b(X^{\prime}, X)}$ is complete.

If $X$ is a barrelled space, then its topology coincides with the strong topology $\beta\left(X, X^{\prime}\right)$ on $X$ and with the Mackey topology on generated by the pairing $\left(X, X^{\prime}\right).$

== Examples ==
If $X$ is a normed vector space, then its (continuous) dual space $X^{\prime}$ with the strong topology coincides with the Banach dual space $X^{\prime}$; that is, with the space $X^{\prime}$ with the topology induced by the operator norm. Conversely $\left(X, X^{\prime}\right).$-topology on $X$ is identical to the topology induced by the norm on $X.$

== See also ==
- Dual topology
- Dual system
- List of topologies – List of concrete topologies and topological spaces
- Polar topology – Dual space topology of uniform convergence on some sub-collection of bounded subsets
- Reflexive space – Locally convex topological vector space
- Semi-reflexive space
- Strong topology
- Topologies on spaces of linear maps

== Bibliography ==
- Narici, Lawrence; Beckenstein, Edward (2011). Topological Vector Spaces. Pure and applied mathematics (Second ed.). Boca Raton, FL: CRC Press. ISBN 978-1584888666. OCLC 144216834.
- Rudin, Walter (1991). Functional Analysis. International Series in Pure and Applied Mathematics. Vol. 8 (Second ed.). New York, NY: McGraw-Hill Science/Engineering/Math. ISBN 978-0-07-054236-5. OCLC 21163277.
- Schaefer, Helmut H.; Wolff, Manfred P. (1999). Topological Vector Spaces. GTM. Vol. 8 (Second ed.). New York, NY: Springer New York Imprint Springer. ISBN 978-1-4612-7155-0. OCLC 840278135.
- Trèves, François (2006) [1967]. Topological Vector Spaces, Distributions and Kernels. Mineola, N.Y.: Dover Publications. ISBN 978-0-486-45352-1. OCLC 853623322.
- Wong (1979). Schwartz spaces, nuclear spaces, and tensor products. Berlin New York: Springer-Verlag. ISBN 3-540-09513-6. OCLC 5126158.
