= Mackey topology =

In functional analysis and related areas of mathematics, the Mackey topology, named after George Mackey, is the finest topology for a topological vector space which still preserves the continuous dual. In other words the Mackey topology does not make linear functions continuous which were discontinuous in the default topology. A topological vector space (TVS) is called a Mackey space if its topology is the same as the Mackey topology.

The Mackey topology is the opposite of the weak topology, which is the coarsest topology on a topological vector space which preserves the continuity of all linear functions in the continuous dual.

The Mackey–Arens theorem states that all possible dual topologies are finer than the weak topology and coarser than the Mackey topology.

== Definition ==
=== Definition for a pairing ===
Given a pairing $(X, Y, b),$ the Mackey topology on $X$ induced by $(X, Y, b),$ denoted by $\tau(X, Y, b),$ is the polar topology defined on $X$ by using the set of all $\sigma(Y, X, b)$-compact disks in $Y.$

When $X$ is endowed with the Mackey topology then it will be denoted by $X_{\tau(X, Y, b)}$ or simply $X_{\tau(X, Y)}$ or $X_{\tau}$ if no ambiguity can arise.

A linear map $F : X \to W$ is said to be Mackey continuous (with respect to pairings $(X, Y, b)$ and $(W, Z, c)$) if $F : (X, \tau(X, Y, b)) \to (W, \tau(W, Z, c))$ is continuous.

=== Definition for a topological vector space ===
The definition of the Mackey topology for a topological vector space (TVS) is a specialization of the above definition of the Mackey topology of a pairing. If $X$ is a TVS with continuous dual space $X^{\prime},$ then the evaluation map $\left(x, x^{\prime}\right) \mapsto x^{\prime}(x)$ on $X \times X^{\prime}$ is called the canonical pairing.

The Mackey topology on a TVS $X,$ denoted by $\tau\left(X, X^{\prime}\right),$ is the Mackey topology on $X$ induced by the canonical pairing $\left\langle X, X^{\prime} \right\rangle.$

That is, the Mackey topology is the polar topology on $X$ obtained by using the set of all weak*-compact disks in $X^{\prime}.$ When $X$ is endowed with the Mackey topology then it will be denoted by $X_{\tau\left(X, X^{\prime}\right)}$ or simply $X_{\tau}$ if no ambiguity can arise.

A linear map $F : X \to Y$ between TVSs is Mackey continuous if $F : \left(X, \tau\left(X, X^{\prime}\right)\right) \to \left(Y, \tau\left(Y, Y^{\prime}\right)\right)$ is continuous.

== Examples ==
Every metrizable locally convex $(X, \nu)$ with continuous dual $X^{\prime}$ carries the Mackey topology, that is $\nu = \tau\left(X, X^{\prime}\right)$ or to put it more succinctly every metrizable locally convex space is a Mackey space.

Every Hausdorff barreled locally convex space is Mackey.

Every Fréchet space $(X, \nu)$ carries the Mackey topology and the topology coincides with the strong topology, that is $\nu = \tau\left(X, X^{\prime}\right) = \beta\left(X, X^{\prime}\right).$

== Applications ==
The Mackey topology has an application in economies with infinitely many commodities.

== See also ==
- Dual system
- Mackey space – Mathematics concept
- Polar topology – Dual space topology of uniform convergence on some sub-collection of bounded subsets
- Strong topology
- Topologies on spaces of linear maps
- Weak topology – Mathematical term

== Bibliography ==
- Bourbaki, Nicolas (1977). Topological vector spaces. Elements of mathematics. Addison–Wesley.
- Bourbaki, Nicolas (1987) [1981]. Topological Vector Spaces: Chapters 1–5. Éléments de mathématique. Translated by Eggleston, H.G.; Madan, S. Berlin New York: Springer-Verlag. ISBN 3-540-13627-4. OCLC 17499190.
- Mackey, G.W. (1946). "On convex topological linear spaces". Trans. Amer. Math. Soc. 60 (3). Transactions of the American Mathematical Society, Vol. 60, No. 3: 519–537. doi:10.2307/1990352. JSTOR 1990352. PMC 1078623.
- Narici, Lawrence; Beckenstein, Edward (2011). Topological Vector Spaces. Pure and applied mathematics (Second ed.). Boca Raton, FL: CRC Press. ISBN 978-1584888666. OCLC 144216834.
- Robertson, A.P.; W.J. Robertson (1964). Topological vector spaces. Cambridge Tracts in Mathematics. Vol. 53. Cambridge University Press. p. 62.
- Schaefer, Helmut H. (1971). Topological vector spaces. GTM. Vol. 3. New York: Springer-Verlag. p. 131. ISBN 0-387-98726-6.
- Schaefer, Helmut H.; Wolff, Manfred P. (1999). Topological Vector Spaces. GTM. Vol. 8 (Second ed.). New York, NY: Springer New York Imprint Springer. ISBN 978-1-4612-7155-0. OCLC 840278135.
- A.I. Shtern (2001) [1994], "Mackey topology", Encyclopedia of Mathematics, EMS Press
