= Bipolar theorem =

Theorem in convex analysis

In mathematics, the bipolar theorem is a theorem in functional analysis that characterizes the bipolar (that is, the polar of the polar) of a set. In convex analysis, the bipolar theorem refers to a necessary and sufficient conditions for a cone to be equal to its bipolar. The bipolar theorem can be seen as a special case of the Fenchel–Moreau theorem.

== Preliminaries ==
Suppose that $X$ is a topological vector space (TVS) with a continuous dual space $X^{\prime}$ and let $\left\langle x, x^{\prime} \right\rangle := x^{\prime}(x)$ for all $x \in X$ and $x^{\prime} \in X^{\prime}.$ The convex hull of a set $A,$ denoted by $\operatorname{co} A,$ is the smallest convex set containing $A.$ The convex balanced hull of a set $A$ is the smallest convex balanced set containing $A.$

The polar of a subset $A \subseteq X$ is defined to be:
$$A^\circ := \left\{ x^{\prime} \in X^{\prime} : \sup_{a \in A} \left| \left\langle a, x^{\prime} \right\rangle \right| \leq 1 \right\}.$$
while the prepolar of a subset $B \subseteq X^{\prime}$ is:
$${}^{\circ} B := \left\{ x \in X : \sup_{x^{\prime} \in B} \left| \left\langle x, x^{\prime} \right\rangle \right| \leq 1 \right\}.$$
The bipolar of a subset $A \subseteq X,$ often denoted by $A^{\circ\circ}$ is the set
$$A^{\circ\circ} := {}^{\circ}\left(A^{\circ}\right)
= \left\{ x \in X : \sup_{x^{\prime} \in A^{\circ}} \left|\left\langle x, x^{\prime} \right\rangle\right| \leq 1 \right\}.$$

== Statement in functional analysis ==
Let $\sigma\left(X, X^{\prime}\right)$ denote the weak topology on $X$ (that is, the weakest TVS topology on $X$ making all linear functionals in $X^{\prime}$ continuous).

The bipolar theorem: The bipolar of a subset $A \subseteq X$ is equal to the $\sigma\left(X, X^{\prime}\right)$-closure of the convex balanced hull of $A.$

== Statement in convex analysis ==
The bipolar theorem: For any nonempty cone $A$ in some linear space $X,$ the bipolar set $A^{\circ \circ}$ is given by:

$$A^{\circ \circ} = \operatorname{cl} (\operatorname{co} \{ r a : r \geq 0, a \in A \}).$$

=== Special case ===
A subset $C \subseteq X$ is a nonempty closed convex cone if and only if $C^{++} = C^{\circ \circ} = C$ when $C^{++} = \left(C^{+}\right)^{+},$ where $A^{+}$ denotes the positive dual cone of a set $A.$ Or more generally, if $C$ is a nonempty convex cone then the bipolar cone is given by
$$C^{\circ \circ} = \operatorname{cl} C.$$

== Relation to the Fenchel–Moreau theorem ==
Let
$$f(x) := \delta(x|C) = \begin{cases}0 & x \in C\\ \infty & \text{otherwise}\end{cases}$$
be the indicator function for a cone $C.$ Then the convex conjugate,
$$f^*(x^*) = \delta\left(x^*|C^\circ\right) = \delta^*\left(x^*|C\right) = \sup_{x \in C} \langle x^*,x \rangle$$
is the support function for $C,$ and $f^{**}(x) = \delta(x|C^{\circ\circ}).$ Therefore, $C = C^{\circ \circ}$ if and only if $f = f^{**}.$

== See also ==
- Dual system – Dual pair of vector spaces
- Fenchel–Moreau theorem – Mathematical theorem in convex analysis − A generalization of the bipolar theorem.
- Polar set – Subset of all points that is bounded by some given point of a dual (in a dual pairing)

== Bibliography ==
- Narici, Lawrence; Beckenstein, Edward (2011). Topological Vector Spaces. Pure and applied mathematics (Second ed.). Boca Raton, FL: CRC Press. ISBN 978-1584888666. OCLC 144216834.
- Schaefer, Helmut H.; Wolff, Manfred P. (1999). Topological Vector Spaces. GTM. Vol. 8 (Second ed.). New York, NY: Springer New York Imprint Springer. ISBN 978-1-4612-7155-0. OCLC 840278135.
- Trèves, François (2006) [1967]. Topological Vector Spaces, Distributions and Kernels. Mineola, N.Y.: Dover Publications. ISBN 978-0-486-45352-1. OCLC 853623322.
