= Dual cone and polar cone =

Concepts in convex analysis

A set C and its dual cone C^{*}.

A set C and its polar cone C^{o}. The dual cone and the polar cone are symmetric to each other with respect to the origin.

Dual cone and polar cone are closely related concepts in convex analysis, a branch of mathematics.

== Dual cone ==
=== In a vector space ===
The dual cone C^{*} of a subset C in a linear space X over the reals, e.g. Euclidean space R^{n}, with dual space X^{*} is the set

$$C^* = \left \{y\in X^*: \langle y , x \rangle \geq 0 \quad \forall x\in C  \right \},$$

where $\langle y, x \rangle$ is the duality pairing between X and X^{*}, i.e. $\langle y, x\rangle = y(x)$.

The set $C^*$ is always a convex cone, even if $C$ is neither convex nor a cone.

=== In a topological vector space ===
If X is a topological vector space over the real or complex numbers, then the dual cone of a subset C ⊆ X is the following set of continuous linear functionals on X:

$C^{\prime} := \left\{ f \in X^{\prime} : \operatorname{Re} \left( f (x) \right) \geq 0 \text{ for all } x \in C \right\}$,

which is the polar of the set -C. No matter what C is, $C^{\prime}$ will be a convex cone. If C ⊆ {0} then $C^{\prime} = X^{\prime}$.

=== In a Hilbert space (internal dual cone) ===
Alternatively, many authors define the dual cone in the context of a real Hilbert space (such as R^{n} equipped with the Euclidean inner product) to be what is sometimes called the internal dual cone.

$$C^*_\text{internal} := \left \{y\in X: \langle y , x \rangle \geq 0 \quad \forall x\in C  \right \}.$$

=== Properties ===
Using this latter definition for C^{*}, we have that when C is a cone, the following properties hold:

- A non-zero vector y is in C^{*} if and only if both of the following conditions hold:
1. y is a normal at the origin of a hyperplane that supports C.
2. y and C lie on the same side of that supporting hyperplane.
- C^{*} is closed and convex.
- $C_1 \subseteq C_2$ implies $C_2^* \subseteq C_1^*$.
- If C has nonempty interior, then C^{*} is pointed, i.e. C* contains no line in its entirety.
- If C is a cone and the closure of C is pointed, then C^{*} has nonempty interior.
- C^{**} is the closure of the smallest convex cone containing C (a consequence of the hyperplane separation theorem)

== Self-dual cones ==
A cone C in a vector space X is said to be self-dual if X can be equipped with an inner product ⟨⋅,⋅⟩ such that the internal dual cone relative to this inner product is equal to C. Those authors who define the dual cone as the internal dual cone in a real Hilbert space usually say that a cone is self-dual if it is equal to its internal dual. This is slightly different from the above definition, which permits a change of inner product. For instance, the above definition makes a cone in R^{n} with ellipsoidal base self-dual, because the inner product can be changed to make the base spherical, and a cone with spherical base in R^{n} is equal to its internal dual.

The nonnegative orthant of R^{n} and the space of all positive semidefinite matrices are self-dual, as are the cones with ellipsoidal base (often called "spherical cones", "Lorentz cones", or sometimes "ice-cream cones"). So are all cones in R^{3} whose base is the convex hull of a regular polygon with an odd number of vertices. A less regular example is the cone in R^{3} whose base is the "house": the convex hull of a square and a point outside the square forming an equilateral triangle (of the appropriate height) with one of the sides of the square.

== Polar cone ==
The polar of the closed convex cone C is the closed convex cone C^{o}, and vice versa.

For a set C in X, the polar cone of C is the set

$$C^o = \left \{y\in X^*: \langle y , x \rangle \leq 0 \quad \forall x\in C  \right \}.$$

It can be seen that the polar cone is equal to the negative of the dual cone, i.e. C^{o} = −C^{*}.

For a closed convex cone C in X, the polar cone is equivalent to the polar set for C.

== See also ==
- Bipolar theorem
- Polar set

== Bibliography ==
- Boltyanski, V. G.; Martini, H.; Soltan, P. (1997). Excursions into combinatorial geometry. New York: Springer. ISBN 3-540-61341-2.
- Goh, C. J.; Yang, X.Q. (2002). Duality in optimization and variational inequalities. London; New York: Taylor & Francis. ISBN 0-415-27479-6.
- Narici, Lawrence; Beckenstein, Edward (2011). Topological Vector Spaces. Pure and applied mathematics (Second ed.). Boca Raton, FL: CRC Press. ISBN 978-1584888666. OCLC 144216834.
- Ramm, A.G. (2000). Shivakumar, P.N.; Strauss, A.V. (eds.). Operator theory and its applications. Providence, R.I.: American Mathematical Society. ISBN 0-8218-1990-9.
- Schaefer, Helmut H.; Wolff, Manfred P. (1999). Topological Vector Spaces. GTM. Vol. 8 (Second ed.). New York, NY: Springer New York Imprint Springer. ISBN 978-1-4612-7155-0. OCLC 840278135.
