= Dual topology =

In functional analysis and related areas of mathematics a dual topology is a locally convex topology on a vector space that is induced by the continuous dual of the vector space, by means of the bilinear form (also called pairing) associated with the dual pair.

The different dual topologies for a given dual pair are characterized by the Mackey–Arens theorem. All locally convex topologies with their continuous dual are trivially a dual pair and the locally convex topology is a dual topology.

Several topological properties depend only on the dual pair and not on the chosen dual topology and thus it is often possible to substitute a complicated dual topology by a simpler one.

== Definition ==
Given a dual pair $(X, Y, \langle , \rangle)$, a dual topology on $X$ is a locally convex topology $\tau$ so that

$$(X, \tau)' \simeq Y.$$

Here $(X, \tau)'$ denotes the continuous dual of $(X,\tau)$ and $(X, \tau)' \simeq Y$ means that there is a linear isomorphism

$$\Psi : Y \to (X, \tau)',\quad y \mapsto (x \mapsto \langle x, y\rangle).$$

(If a locally convex topology $\tau$ on $X$ is not a dual topology, then either $\Psi$ is not surjective or it is ill-defined since the linear functional $x \mapsto \langle x, y\rangle$ is not continuous on $X$ for some $y$.)

== Properties ==
- Theorem (by Mackey): Given a dual pair, the bounded sets under any dual topology are identical.
- Under any dual topology the same sets are barrelled.

== Characterization of dual topologies ==
The Mackey–Arens theorem, named after George Mackey and Richard Arens, characterizes all possible dual topologies on a locally convex space.

The theorem shows that the coarsest dual topology is the weak topology, the topology of uniform convergence on all finite subsets of $X'$, and the finest topology is the Mackey topology, the topology of uniform convergence on all absolutely convex weakly compact subsets of $X'$.

=== Mackey–Arens theorem ===
Given a dual pair $(X, X')$ with $X$ a locally convex space and $X'$ its continuous dual, then $\tau$ is a dual topology on $X$ if and only if it is a topology of uniform convergence on a family of absolutely convex and weakly compact subsets of $X'$

== See also ==
- Polar topology
