= Polar set =

Subset of all points that is bounded by some given point of a dual (in a dual pairing)

In functional and convex analysis, and related disciplines of mathematics, the polar set $A^{\circ}$ is a special convex set associated to any subset $A$ of a vector space $X,$ lying in the dual space $X^{\prime}.$ The bipolar of a subset is the polar of $A^\circ,$ but lies in $X$ (not $X^{\prime\prime}$).

== Definitions ==
There are at least three competing definitions of the polar of a set, originating in projective geometry and convex analysis. In each case, the definition describes a duality between certain subsets of a pairing of vector spaces $\langle X, Y \rangle$ over the real or complex numbers ($X$ and $Y$ are often topological vector spaces (TVSs)).

If $X$ is a vector space over the field $\mathbb{K}$ then unless indicated otherwise, $Y$ will usually, but not always, be some vector space of linear functionals on $X$ and the dual pairing $\langle \cdot, \cdot \rangle : X \times Y \to \mathbb{K}$ will be the bilinear evaluation (at a point) map defined by $\langle x, f \rangle := f(x).$ If $X$ is a topological vector space then the space $Y$ will usually, but not always, be the continuous dual space of $X,$ in which case the dual pairing will again be the evaluation map.

Denote the closed ball of radius $r \geq 0$ centered at the origin in the underlying scalar field $\mathbb{K}$ of $X$ by $B_r := B_r^{\mathbb{K}} := \{s \in \mathbb{K} : |s| \leq r\}.$

=== Functional analytic definition ===
==== Absolute polar ====
Suppose that $\langle X, Y \rangle$ is a pairing. The polar or absolute polar of a subset $A$ of $X$ is the set:
$$\begin{alignat}{4}
A^{\circ}
:=& \left\{y \in Y ~:~ \sup_{a \in A} |\langle a, y \rangle| \leq 1\right\} ~~~~&& \\[0.7ex]
=& \left\{y \in Y ~:~ \sup |\langle A, y \rangle| \leq 1\right\} ~~~~&& \text{ where } |\langle A, y \rangle| := \{|\langle a, y \rangle| : a \in A\} \\[0.7ex]
=& \left\{y \in Y ~:~ \langle A, y \rangle \subseteq B_1\right\} ~~~~&& \text{ where } B_1 := \{s \in \mathbb{K} : |s| \leq 1\}.\\[0.7ex]
\end{alignat}$$

where $\langle A, y \rangle := \{\langle a, y \rangle : a \in A\}$ denotes the image of the set $A$ under the map $\langle \cdot, y \rangle : X \to \mathbb{K}$ defined by $x \mapsto \langle x, y \rangle.$ If $\operatorname{cobal} A$ denotes the convex balanced hull of $A,$ which by definition is the smallest convex and balanced subset of $X$ that contains $A,$ then $A^{\circ} = [\operatorname{cobal} A]^\circ.$

This is an affine shift of the geometric definition; it has the useful characterization that the functional-analytic polar of the unit ball (in $X$) is precisely the unit ball (in $Y$).

The prepolar or absolute prepolar of a subset $B$ of $Y$ is the set: ${}^{\circ} B := \left\{x \in X ~:~ \sup_{b \in B} |\langle x, b \rangle| \leq 1\right\} = \{x \in X ~:~ \sup |\langle x, B \rangle| \leq 1\}$

Very often, the prepolar of a subset $B$ of $Y$ is also called the polar or absolute polar of $B$ and denoted by $B^{\circ}$; in practice, this reuse of notation and of the word "polar" rarely causes any issues (such as ambiguity) and many authors do not even use the word "prepolar".

The bipolar of a subset $A$ of $X,$ often denoted by $A^{\circ \circ},$ is the set ${}^{\circ}\left(A^{\circ}\right)$; that is, $A^{\circ \circ} := {}^{\circ}\left(A^{\circ}\right) = \left\{x \in X ~:~ \sup_{y \in A^{\circ}} |\langle x, y \rangle| \leq 1\right\}.$

==== Real polar ====
The real polar of a subset $A$ of $X$ is the set: $A^r := \left\{y \in Y ~:~ \sup_{a \in A} \operatorname{Re} \langle a, y \rangle \leq 1\right\}$ and the real prepolar of a subset $B$ of $Y$ is the set: ${}^r B := \left\{x \in X ~:~ \sup_{b \in B} \operatorname{Re} \langle x, b \rangle \leq 1\right\}.$

As with the absolute prepolar, the real prepolar is usually called the real polar and is also denoted by $B^r.$ It's important to note that some authors (e.g. [Schaefer 1999]) define "polar" to mean "real polar" (rather than "absolute polar", as is done in this article) and use the notation $A^{\circ}$ for it (rather than the notation $A^r$ that is used in this article and in [Narici 2011]).

The real bipolar of a subset $A$ of $X,$ sometimes denoted by $A^{r r},$ is the set ${}^{r}\left(A^r\right)$; it is equal to the $\sigma(X, Y)$-closure of the convex hull of $A \cup \{0\}.$

For a subset $A$ of $X,$ $A^r$ is convex, $\sigma(Y, X)$-closed, and contains $A^{\circ}.$ In general, it is possible that $A^{\circ} \neq A^r$ but equality will hold if $A$ is balanced. Furthermore, $A^{\circ} = \left(\operatorname{bal} \left(A^{r}\right)\right)$ where $\operatorname{bal} \left(A^{r}\right)$ denotes the balanced hull of $A^r.$

==== Competing definitions ====
The definition of the "polar" of a set is not universally agreed upon. Although this article defined "polar" to mean "absolute polar", some authors define "polar" to mean "real polar" and other authors use still other definitions. No matter how an author defines "polar", the notation $A^{\circ}$ almost always represents their choice of the definition (so the meaning of the notation $A^{\circ}$ may vary from source to source). In particular, the polar of $A$ is sometimes defined as: $A^{|r|} := \left\{y \in Y ~:~ \sup_{a \in A} |\operatorname{Re} \langle a, y \rangle| \leq 1\right\}$ where the notation $A^{|r|}$ is not standard notation.

We now briefly discuss how these various definitions relate to one another and when they are equivalent.

It is always the case that $A^{\circ} ~ \subseteq ~ A^{|r|} ~ \subseteq ~ A^r$ and if $\langle \cdot, \cdot \rangle$ is real-valued (or equivalently, if $X$ and $Y$ are vector spaces over $\R$) then $A^{\circ} = A^{|r|}.$

If $A$ is a symmetric set (that is, $-A = A$ or equivalently, $-A \subseteq A$) then $A^{|r|} = A^r$ where if in addition $\langle \cdot, \cdot \rangle$ is real-valued then $A^{\circ} = A^{|r|} = A^r.$

If $X$ and $Y$ are vector spaces over $\C$ (so that $\langle \cdot, \cdot \rangle$ is complex-valued) and if $i A \subseteq A$ (where note that this implies $-A = A$ and $i A = A$), then $A^{\circ} \subseteq A^{|r|} = A^r \subseteq \left(\tfrac{1}{\sqrt{2}} A\right)^{\circ}$ where if in addition $e^{i r} A \subseteq A$ for all real $r$ then $A^{\circ} = A^r.$

Thus for all of these definitions of the polar set of $A$ to agree, it suffices that $s A \subseteq A$ for all scalars $s$ of unit length (Note: Since for all of these completing definitions of the polar set $A^{\circ}$ to agree, if $\langle \cdot, \cdot \rangle$ is real-valued then it suffices for $A$ to be symmetric, while if $\langle \cdot, \cdot \rangle$ is complex-valued then it suffices that $e^{i r} A \subseteq A$ for all real $s.$) (where this is equivalent to $s A = A$ for all unit length scalar $s$). In particular, all definitions of the polar of $A$ agree when $A$ is a balanced set (which is often, but not always, the case) so that often, which of these competing definitions is used is immaterial. However, these differences in the definitions of the "polar" of a set $A$ do sometimes introduce subtle or important technical differences when $A$ is not necessarily balanced.

==== Specialization for the canonical duality ====
Algebraic dual space

If $X$ is any vector space then let $X^{\#}$ denote the algebraic dual space of $X,$ which is the set of all linear functionals on $X.$ The vector space $X^{\#}$ is always a closed subset of the space $\mathbb{K}^X$ of all $\mathbb{K}$-valued functions on $X$ under the topology of pointwise convergence so when $X^{\#}$ is endowed with the subspace topology, then $X^{\#}$ becomes a Hausdorff complete locally convex topological vector space (TVS). For any subset $A \subseteq X,$ let
$$\begin{alignat}{4}
A^{\#} := A^{\circ, \#}
:=& \left\{f \in X^{\#} ~:~ \sup_{a \in A} |f(a)| \leq 1\right\} && \\[0.7ex]
=& \left\{f \in X^{\#}  ~:~ \sup |f(A)| \leq 1\right\}  ~~~~&& \text{ where } |f(A)| := \{|f(a)| : a \in A\} \\[0.7ex]
=& \left\{f \in X^{\#}  ~:~ f(A) \subseteq B_1\right\}  ~~~&& \text{ where } B_1 := \{s \in \mathbb{K} : |s| \leq 1\}.\\[0.7ex]
\end{alignat}$$

If $A \subseteq B \subseteq X$ are any subsets then $B^{\#} \subseteq A^{\#}$ and $A^{\#} = [\operatorname{cobal} A]^{\#},$ where $\operatorname{cobal} A$ denotes the convex balanced hull of $A.$ For any finite-dimensional vector subspace $Y$ of $X,$ let $\tau_Y$ denote the Euclidean topology on $Y,$ which is the unique topology that makes $Y$ into a Hausdorff topological vector space (TVS). If $A_{\cup \operatorname{cl} \operatorname{Finite}}$ denotes the union of all closures $\operatorname{cl}_{\left(Y, \tau_Y\right)} (Y \cap A)$ as $Y$ varies over all finite dimensional vector subspaces of $X,$ then $A^{\#} = \left[A_{\cup \operatorname{cl} \operatorname{Finite}}\right]^{\#}$ (see this footnote (Note: To prove that $A^{\#} \subseteq \left[A_{\cup \operatorname{cl} \operatorname{Finite}}\right]^{\#},$ let $f \in A^{\#}.$ If $Y$ is a finite-dimensional vector subspace of $X$ then because $f\big\vert_Y : \left(Y, \tau_Y\right) \to \mathbb{K}$ is continuous (as is true of all linear functionals on a finite-dimensional Hausdorff TVS), it follows from $f(A) \subseteq B_1$ and $B_1$ being a closed set that $f\left(\operatorname{cl}_{\left(Y, \tau_Y\right)} (Y \cap A)\right) = f\big\vert_Y \left(\operatorname{cl}_{\left(Y, \tau_Y\right)} (Y \cap A)\right) \subseteq \operatorname{cl}_{\mathbb{K}}(f(Y \cap A)) \subseteq \operatorname{cl}_{\mathbb{K}} f(A) \subseteq \operatorname{cl}_{\mathbb{K}} B_1 = B_1.$ The union of all such sets is consequently also a subset of $B_1,$ which proves that $f\left(A_{\cup \operatorname{cl} \operatorname{Finite}}\right) \subseteq B_1$ and so $f \in \left[A_{\cup \operatorname{cl} \operatorname{Finite}}\right]^{\#}.$ $\blacksquare$ In general, if $\tau$ is any TVS-topology on $X$ then $A_{\cup \operatorname{cl} \operatorname{Finite}} \subseteq \operatorname{cl}_{(X, \tau)} A.$) for an explanation). If $A$ is an absorbing subset of $X$ then by the Banach–Alaoglu theorem, $A^{\#}$ is a weak-* compact subset of $X^{\#}.$

If $A \subseteq X$ is any non-empty subset of a vector space $X$ and if $Y$ is any vector space of linear functionals on $X$ (that is, a vector subspace of the algebraic dual space of $X$) then the real-valued map

$|\,\cdot\,|_A \;:\, Y \,\to\, \Reals$ defined by $\left|x^{\prime}\right|_A ~:=~ \sup \left|x^{\prime}(A)\right| ~:=~ \sup_{a \in A} \left|x^{\prime}(a)\right|$

is a seminorm on $Y.$ If $A = \varnothing$ then by definition of the supremum, $\, \sup \left| x^{\prime}(A) \right| = -\infty \,$ so that the map $\, |\,\cdot\,|_{\varnothing} = -\infty \,$ defined above would not be real-valued and consequently, it would not be a seminorm.

Continuous dual space

Suppose that $X$ is a topological vector space (TVS) with continuous dual space $X^{\prime}.$ The important special case where $Y := X^{\prime}$ and the brackets represent the canonical map: $\left\langle x, x^{\prime} \right\rangle := x^{\prime}(x)$ is now considered. The triple $\left\langle X, X^{\prime} \right\rangle$ is the called the canonical pairing associated with $X.$

The polar of a subset $A \subseteq X$ with respect to this canonical pairing is:
$$\begin{alignat}{4}
A^{\circ}
:=& \left\{x^{\prime} \in X^{\prime} ~:~ \sup_{a \in A} \left|x^{\prime}(a)\right| \leq 1\right\} ~~~~&& \text{ because } \left\langle a, x^{\prime} \right\rangle := x^{\prime}(a)  \\[0.7ex]
=& \left\{x^{\prime} \in X^{\prime} ~:~ \sup \left|x^{\prime}(A)\right| \leq 1\right\} ~~~~&& \text{ where } \left|x^{\prime}(A)\right| := \left\{\left|x^{\prime}(a)\right| : a \in A\right\} \\[0.7ex]
=& \left\{x^{\prime} \in X^{\prime} ~:~ x^{\prime}(A) \subseteq B_1\right\} ~~~~&&  \text{ where } B_1 := \{s \in \mathbb{K} : |s| \leq 1\}.\\[0.7ex]
\end{alignat}$$

For any subset $A \subseteq X,$ $A^{\circ} = \left[\operatorname{cl}_X A\right]^{\circ}$ where $\operatorname{cl}_X A$ denotes the closure of $A$ in $X.$

The Banach–Alaoglu theorem states that if $A \subseteq X$ is a neighborhood of the origin in $X$ then $A^{\circ} = A^{\#}$ and this polar set is a compact subset of the continuous dual space $X^{\prime}$ when $X^{\prime}$ is endowed with the weak-* topology (also known as the topology of pointwise convergence).

If $A$ satisfies $s A \subseteq A$ for all scalars $s$ of unit length then one may replace the absolute value signs by $\operatorname{Re}$ (the real part operator) so that:
$$\begin{alignat}{4}
A^{\circ} = A^r
:=& \left\{x^{\prime} \in X^{\prime} ~:~ \sup_{a \in A} \operatorname{Re} x^{\prime}(a) \leq 1\right\} \\[0.7ex]
=& \left\{x^{\prime} \in X^{\prime} ~:~ \sup \operatorname{Re} x^{\prime}(A) \leq 1\right\}. \\[0.7ex]
\end{alignat}$$

The prepolar of a subset $B$ of $Y = X^{\prime}$ is: ${}^{\circ} B := \left\{x \in X ~:~ \sup_{b^{\prime} \in B} \left|b^{\prime}(x)\right| \leq 1\right\} = \{x \in X : \sup |B(x)| \leq 1\}$

If $B$ satisfies $s B \subseteq B$ for all scalars $s$ of unit length then one may replace the absolute value signs with $\operatorname{Re}$ so that: ${}^{\circ} B = \left\{x \in X ~:~ \sup_{b^{\prime} \in B} \operatorname{Re} b^{\prime}(x) \leq 1\right\} = \{x \in X ~:~ \sup \operatorname{Re} B(x) \leq 1\}$ where $B(x) := \left\{b^{\prime}(x) ~:~ b^{\prime} \in B\right\}.$

The bipolar theorem characterizes the bipolar of a subset of a topological vector space.

If $X$ is a normed space and $S$ is the open or closed unit ball in $X$ (or even any subset of the closed unit ball that contains the open unit ball) then $S^{\circ}$ is the closed unit ball in the continuous dual space $X^{\prime}$ when $X^{\prime}$ is endowed with its canonical dual norm.

=== Geometric definition for cones ===
The polar cone of a convex cone $A \subseteq X$ is the set $A^{\circ} := \left\{y \in Y ~:~ \sup_{x \in A} \langle x, y \rangle \leq 0\right\}$

This definition gives a duality on points and hyperplanes, writing the latter as the intersection of two oppositely-oriented half-spaces. The polar hyperplane of a point $x \in X$ is the locus $\{y ~:~ \langle y, x \rangle = 0\}$; the dual relationship for a hyperplane yields that hyperplane's polar point.

Some authors (confusingly) call a dual cone the polar cone; we will not follow that convention in this article.

== Properties ==
Unless stated otherwise, $\langle X, Y \rangle$ will be a pairing. The topology $\sigma(Y, X)$ is the weak-* topology on $Y$ while $\sigma(X, Y)$ is the weak topology on $X.$ For any set $A,$ $A^r$ denotes the real polar of $A$ and $A^{\circ}$ denotes the absolute polar of $A.$ The term "polar" will refer to the absolute polar.

- The (absolute) polar of a set is convex and balanced.
- The real polar $A^r$ of a subset $A$ of $X$ is convex but not necessarily balanced; $A^r$ will be balanced if $A$ is balanced.
- If $s A \subseteq A$ for all scalars $s$ of unit length then $A^{\circ} = A^r.$
- $A^{\circ}$ is closed in $Y$ under the weak-*-topology on $Y$.
- A subset $S$ of $X$ is weakly bounded (i.e. $\sigma(X, Y)$-bounded) if and only if $S^{\circ}$ is absorbing in $Y$.
- For a dual pair $\langle X, X^{\prime} \rangle,$ where $X$ is a TVS and $X^{\prime}$ is its continuous dual space, if $B \subseteq X$ is bounded then $B^{\circ}$ is absorbing in $X^{\prime}.$ If $X$ is locally convex and $B^{\circ}$ is absorbing in $X^{\prime}$ then $B$ is bounded in $X.$ Moreover, a subset $S$ of $X$ is weakly bounded if and only if $S^{\circ}$ is absorbing in $X^{\prime}.$
- The bipolar $A^{\circ\circ}$ of a set $A$ is the $\sigma(X, Y)$-closed convex hull of $A \cup \{0\},$ that is the smallest $\sigma(X, Y)$-closed and convex set containing both $A$ and $0.$
  - Similarly, the bidual cone of a cone $A$ is the $\sigma(X, Y)$-closed conic hull of $A.$
- If $\mathcal{B}$ is a base at the origin for a TVS $X$ then $X^{\prime} = \bigcup_{B \in \mathbb{B}} \left(B^{\circ}\right).$
- If $X$ is a locally convex TVS then the polars (taken with respect to $\left\langle X, X^{\prime} \right\rangle$) of any 0-neighborhood base forms a fundamental family of equicontinuous subsets of $X^{\prime}$ (i.e. given any bounded subset $H$ of $X^{\prime}_{\sigma},$ there exists a neighborhood $S$ of the origin in $X$ such that $H \subseteq S^{\circ}$).
  - Conversely, if $X$ is a locally convex TVS then the polars (taken with respect to $\langle X, X^{\#} \rangle$) of any fundamental family of equicontinuous subsets of $X^{\prime}$ form a neighborhood base of the origin in $X.$
- Let $X$ be a TVS with a topology $\tau.$ Then $\tau$ is a locally convex TVS topology if and only if $\tau$ is the topology of uniform convergence on the equicontinuous subsets of $X^{\prime}.$

The last two results explain why equicontinuous subsets of the continuous dual space play such a prominent role in the modern theory of functional analysis: because equicontinuous subsets encapsulate all information about the locally convex space $X$'s original topology.

Set relations

- $X^{\circ} = X^{|r|} = X^r = \{0\}$ and $\varnothing^{\circ} = \varnothing^{|r|} = \varnothing^r = Y.$
- For all scalars $s \neq 0,$ $(s A)^{\circ} = \tfrac{1}{s} \left(A^{\circ}\right)$ and for all real $t \neq 0,$ $(t A)^{|r|} = \tfrac{1}{t} \left(A^{|r|}\right)$ and $(t A)^r = \tfrac{1}{t} \left(A^r\right).$
- $A^{\circ\circ\circ} = A^{\circ}.$ However, for the real polar we have $A^{r r r} \subseteq A^r.$
- For any finite collection of sets $A_1, \ldots, A_n,$ $\left(A_1 \cap \cdots \cap A_n\right)^{\circ} = \left(A_1^{\circ}\right) \cup \cdots \cup \left(A_n^{\circ}\right).$
- If $A \subseteq B$ then $B^{\circ} \subseteq A^{\circ},$ $B^r \subseteq A^r,$ and $B^{|r|} \subseteq A^{|r|}.$
  - An immediate corollary is that $\bigcup_{i \in I} \left(A_i^{\circ}\right) \subseteq \left(\bigcap_{i \in I} A_i\right)^{\circ}$; equality necessarily holds when $I$ is finite and may fail to hold if $I$ is infinite.
- $\bigcap_{i \in I} \left(A_i^{\circ}\right) = \left(\bigcup_{i \in I} A_i\right)^{\circ}$ and $\bigcap_{i \in I} \left(A_i^r\right) = \left(\bigcup_{i \in I} A_i\right)^r.$
- If $C$ is a cone in $X$ then $C^{\circ} = \left\{ y \in Y : \langle c, y \rangle = 0 \text{ for all } c \in C \right\}.$
- If $\left(S_i\right)_{i \in I}$ is a family of $\sigma(X, Y)$-closed subsets of $X$ containing $0 \in X,$ then the real polar of $\cap_{i \in I} S_i$ is the closed convex hull of $\cup_{i \in I} \left(S_i^r\right).$
- If $0 \in A \cap B$ then $A^{\circ} \cap B^{\circ} \subseteq 2 \left[(A + B)^{\circ}\right] \subseteq 2\left(A^{\circ} \cap B^{\circ}\right).$
- For a closed convex cone $C$ in a real vector space $X,$ the polar cone is the polar of $C$; that is, $C^{\circ} = \{y \in Y : \sup_{} \langle C, y \rangle \leq 0\},$ where $\sup_{} \langle C, y \rangle := \sup_{c \in C} \langle c, y \rangle.$

== See also ==
- Banach–Alaoglu theorem – Theorem in functional analysis
- Bipolar theorem – Theorem in convex analysis
- Polar cone – Concepts in convex analysis
- Polar topology – Dual space topology of uniform convergence on some sub-collection of bounded subsets
- Locally convex topological vector space – Vector space with a topology defined by convex open sets
- Topological vector space – Vector space with a notion of nearness

== Bibliography ==
- Jarchow, Hans (1981). Locally convex spaces. Stuttgart: B.G. Teubner. ISBN 978-3-519-02224-4. OCLC 8210342.
- Köthe, Gottfried (1983) [1969]. Topological Vector Spaces I. Grundlehren der mathematischen Wissenschaften. Vol. 159. Translated by Garling, D.J.H. New York: Springer Science & Business Media. ISBN 978-3-642-64988-2. MR 0248498. OCLC 840293704.
- Narici, Lawrence; Beckenstein, Edward (2011). Topological Vector Spaces. Pure and applied mathematics (Second ed.). Boca Raton, FL: CRC Press. ISBN 978-1584888666. OCLC 144216834.
- Robertson, Alex P.; Robertson, Wendy J. (1980). Topological Vector Spaces. Cambridge Tracts in Mathematics. Vol. 53. Cambridge England: Cambridge University Press. ISBN 978-0-521-29882-7. OCLC 589250.
- Schaefer, Helmut H.; Wolff, Manfred P. (1999). Topological Vector Spaces. GTM. Vol. 8 (Second ed.). New York, NY: Springer New York Imprint Springer. ISBN 978-1-4612-7155-0. OCLC 840278135.
- Trèves, François (2006) [1967]. Topological Vector Spaces, Distributions and Kernels. Mineola, N.Y.: Dover Publications. ISBN 978-0-486-45352-1. OCLC 853623322.
- Wilansky, Albert (2013). Modern Methods in Topological Vector Spaces. Mineola, New York: Dover Publications, Inc. ISBN 978-0-486-49353-4. OCLC 849801114.
