= Polar topology =

Dual space topology of uniform convergence on some sub-collection of bounded subsets

In functional analysis and related areas of mathematics a polar topology, topology of $\mathcal{G}$-convergence or topology of uniform convergence on the sets of $\mathcal{G}$ is a method to define locally convex topologies on the vector spaces of a pairing.

== Preliminaries ==
A pairing is a triple $(X, Y, b)$ consisting of two vector spaces over a field $\mathbb{K}$ (either the real numbers or complex numbers) and a bilinear map $b : X \times Y \to \mathbb{K}.$ A dual pair or dual system is a pairing $(X, Y, b)$ satisfying the following two separation axioms:

1. $Y$ separates/distinguishes points of $X$: for all non-zero $x \in X,$ there exists $y \in Y$ such that $b(x, y) \neq 0,$ and
2. $X$ separates/distinguishes points of $Y$: for all non-zero $y \in Y,$ there exists $x \in X$ such that $b(x, y) \neq 0.$

=== Polars ===
The polar or absolute polar of a subset $A \subseteq X$ is the set

$$A^{\circ} := \left\{ y \in Y : \sup_{x \in A} |b(x, y)| \leq 1 \right\}.$$

Dually, the polar or absolute polar of a subset $B \subseteq Y$ is denoted by $B^{\circ},$ and defined by

$$B^{\circ} := \left\{ x \in X : \sup_{y \in B} |b(x, y)| \leq 1 \right\}.$$

In this case, the absolute polar of a subset $B \subseteq Y$ is also called the prepolar of $B$ and may be denoted by ${}^{\circ} B.$

The polar is a convex balanced set containing the origin.

If $A \subseteq X$ then the bipolar of $A,$ denoted by $A^{\circ \circ},$ is defined by $A^{\circ \circ} = {}^{\circ}(A^\circ).$ Similarly, if $B \subseteq Y$ then the bipolar of $B$ is defined to be $B^{\circ \circ} = \left({}^{\circ} B\right)^{\circ}.$

=== Weak topologies ===
Suppose that $(X, Y, b)$ is a pairing of vector spaces over $\mathbb{K}.$

Notation: For all $x \in X,$ let $b(x, \cdot) : Y \to \mathbb{K}$ denote the linear functional on $Y$ defined by $y \mapsto b(x, y)$ and let $b(X, \cdot) = \left\{ b(x, \cdot) ~:~ x \in X \right\}.$
Similarly, for all $y \in Y,$ let $b(\cdot, y) : X \to \mathbb{K}$ be defined by $x \mapsto b(x, y)$ and let $b(\cdot, Y) = \left\{ b(\cdot, y) ~:~ y \in Y \right\}.$

The weak topology on $X$ induced by $Y$ (and $b$) is the weakest TVS topology on $X,$ denoted by $\sigma(X, Y, b)$ or simply $\sigma(X, Y),$ making all maps $b(\cdot, y) : X \to \mathbb{K}$ continuous, as $y$ ranges over $Y.$ Similarly, there are the dual definition of the weak topology on $Y$ induced by $X$ (and $b$), which is denoted by $\sigma(Y, X, b)$ or simply $\sigma(Y, X)$: it is the weakest TVS topology on $Y$ making all maps $b(x, \cdot) : Y \to \mathbb{K}$ continuous, as $x$ ranges over $X.$

=== Weak boundedness and absorbing polars ===
It is because of the following theorem that it is almost always assumed that the family $\mathcal{G}$ consists of $\sigma(X, Y, b)$-bounded subsets of $X.$

Theorem—For any subset $A \subseteq X,$ the following are equivalent:

1. $A^{\circ}$ is an absorbing subset of $Y.$
  - If this condition is not satisfied then $A^{\circ}$ can not possibly be a neighborhood of the origin in any TVS topology on $X'$;
2. $A$ is a $\sigma(X, Y, b)$-bounded set; said differently, $A$ is a bounded subset of $(X, \sigma(X, Y, b))$;
3. for all $y \in Y,$ $\sup_{a \in A} \left| b(a, y) \right| < \infty,$ where this supremum may also be denoted by $~\sup \left| b(A, y) \right|.$

The $\sigma(Y, X, b)$-bounded subsets of $Y$ have an analogous characterization.

=== Dual definitions and results ===
Every pairing $(X, Y, b)$ can be associated with a corresponding pairing $(Y, X, \hat{b})$ where by definition $\hat{b}(y, x) = b(x, y).$

There is a repeating theme in duality theory, which is that any definition for a pairing $(X, Y, b)$ has a corresponding dual definition for the pairing $(Y, X, \hat{b}).$

Convention and Definition: Given any definition for a pairing $(X, Y, b),$ one obtains a dual definition by applying it to the pairing $(Y, X, \hat{b}).$ If the definition depends on the order of $X$ and $Y$ (e.g. the definition of "the weak topology $\sigma(X, Y)$ defined on $X$ by $Y$") then by switching the order of $X$ and $Y,$ it is meant that this definition should be applied to $(Y, X, \hat{b})$ (e.g. this gives us the definition of "the weak topology $\sigma(Y, X)$ defined on $Y$ by $X$").

For instance, after defining "$X$ distinguishes points of $Y$" (resp, "$S$ is a total subset of $Y$") as above, then the dual definition of "$Y$ distinguishes points of $X$" (resp, "$S$ is a total subset of $X$") is immediately obtained. For instance, once $\sigma(X, Y)$ is defined then it should be automatically assume that $\sigma(Y, X)$ has been defined without mentioning the analogous definition. The same applies to many theorems.

Convention: Adhering to common practice, unless clarity is needed, whenever a definition (or result) is given for a pairing $(X, Y, b)$ then mention the corresponding dual definition (or result) will be omitted but it may nevertheless be used.

In particular, although this article will only define the general notion of polar topologies on $Y$ with $\mathcal{G}$ being a collection of $\sigma(X, Y)$-bounded subsets of $X,$ this article will nevertheless use the dual definition for polar topologies on $X$ with $\mathcal{G}$ being a collection of $\sigma(Y, X)$-bounded subsets of $Y.$

Identification of $(X, Y)$ with $(Y, X)$

Although it is technically incorrect and an abuse of notation, the following convention is nearly ubiquitous:

Convention: This article will use the common practice of treating a pairing $(X, Y, b)$ interchangeably with $\left(Y, X, \hat{b}\right)$ and also denoting $\left(Y, X, \hat{b}\right)$ by $(Y, X, b).$

== Polar topologies ==
Throughout, $(X, Y, b)$ is a pairing of vector spaces over the field $\mathbb{K}$ and $\mathcal{G}$ is a non-empty collection of $\sigma(X, Y, b)$-bounded subsets of $X.$

For every $G \in \mathcal{G}$ and $r > 0,$ $r G^{\circ} = r \left(G^{\circ}\right)$ is convex and balanced and because $G$ is a $\sigma(X, Y, b)$-bounded, the set $r G^{\circ}$ is absorbing in $Y.$

The polar topology on $Y$ determined (or generated) by $\mathcal{G}$ (and $b$), also called the $\mathcal{G}$-topology on $Y$ or the topology of uniform convergence on the sets of $\mathcal{G},$ is the unique topological vector space (TVS) topology on $Y$ for which

$$\left\{ r G^{\circ} ~:~ G \in \mathcal{G}, r > 0 \right\}$$

forms a neighbourhood subbasis at the origin. When $Y$ is endowed with this $\mathcal{G}$-topology then it is denoted by $Y_{\mathcal{G}}.$

If $\left(r_i\right)_{i=1}^{\infty}$ is a sequence of positive numbers converging to $0$ then the defining neighborhood subbasis at $0$ may be replaced with

$$\left\{ r_i G^{\circ} ~:~ G \in \mathcal{G}, i = 1, 2, \ldots \right\}$$

without changing the resulting topology.

When $\mathcal{G}$ is a directed set with respect to subset inclusion (i.e. if for all $G, H \in \mathcal{G},$ there exists some $K \not\in \mathcal{G}$ such that $G \cup H \subseteq K$) then the defining neighborhood subbasis at the origin actually forms a neighborhood basis at $0.$

Seminorms defining the polar topology

Every $G \in \mathcal{G}$ determines a seminorm $p_G : Y \to \mathbb{R}$ defined by

$$p_G(y) =\sup_{g \in G} |b(g, y)| = \sup|b(G,y)|$$

where $G^{\circ} = \left\{ y \in Y : p_G(y) \leq 1 \right\}$ and $p_G$ is in fact the Minkowski functional of $G^{\circ}.$ Because of this, the $\mathcal{G}$-topology on $Y$ is always a locally convex topology.

Modifying $\mathcal{G}$

If every positive scalar multiple of a set in $\mathcal{G}$ is contained in some set belonging to $\mathcal{G}$ then the defining neighborhood subbasis at the origin can be replaced with

$$\left\{ G^{\circ} : G \in \mathcal{G} \right\}$$

without changing the resulting topology.

The following theorem gives ways in which $\mathcal{G}$ can be modified without changing the resulting $\mathcal{G}$-topology on $Y.$

Theorem—Let $(X, Y, b)$ is a pairing of vector spaces over $\mathbb{K}$ and let $\mathcal{G}$ be a non-empty collection of $\sigma(X, Y, b)$-bounded subsets of $X.$ The $\mathcal{G}$-topology on $Y$ is not altered if $\mathcal{G}$ is replaced by any of the following collections of [$\sigma(X, Y, b)$-bounded] subsets of $X$:

1. all subsets of all finite unions of sets in $\mathcal{G}$;
2. all scalar multiples of all sets in $\mathcal{G}$;
3. the balanced hull of every set in $\mathcal{G}$;
4. the convex hull of every set in $\mathcal{G}$;
5. the $\sigma(X, Y, b)$-closure of every set in $\mathcal{G}$;
6. the $\sigma(X, Y, b)$-closure of the convex balanced hull of every set in $\mathcal{G}.$

It is because of this theorem that many authors often require that $\mathcal{G}$ also satisfy the following additional conditions:

- The union of any two sets $A, B \in \mathcal{G}$ is contained in some set $C \in \mathcal{G}$;
- All scalar multiples of every $G \in \mathcal{G}$ belongs to $\mathcal{G}.$

Some authors further assume that every $x \in X$ belongs to some set $G \in \mathcal{G}$ because this assumption suffices to ensure that the $\mathcal{G}$-topology is Hausdorff.

Convergence of nets and filters

If $\left(y_i\right)_{i \in I}$ is a net in $Y$ then $\left(y_i\right)_{i \in I} \to 0$ in the $\mathcal{G}$-topology on $Y$ if and only if for every $G \in \mathcal{G},$ $p_G(y_i) = \sup_{g \in G} |b(g, y_i)| \to 0,$ or in words, if and only if for every $G \in \mathcal{G},$ the net of linear functionals $(b(\cdot, y_i))_{i \in I}$ on $X$ converges uniformly to $0$ on $G$; here, for each $i \in I,$ the linear functional $b(\cdot, y_i)$ is defined by $x \mapsto b(x, y_i).$

If $y \in Y$ then $\left(y_i\right)_{i \in I} \to y$ in the $\mathcal{G}$-topology on $Y$ if and only if for all $G \in \mathcal{G},$ $p_G\left(y_i - y\right) = \sup \left|b\left(G, y_i - y\right)\right| \to 0.$

A filter $\mathcal{F}$ on $Y$ converges to an element $y \in Y$ in the $\mathcal{G}$-topology on $Y$ if $\mathcal{F}$ converges uniformly to $y$ on each $G \in \mathcal{G}.$

== Properties ==
The results in the article Topologies on spaces of linear maps can be applied to polar topologies.

Throughout, $(X, Y, b)$ is a pairing of vector spaces over the field $\mathbb{K}$ and $\mathcal{G}$ is a non-empty collection of $\sigma(X, Y, b)$-bounded subsets of $X.$

Hausdorffness

We say that $\mathcal{G}$ covers $X$ if every point in $X$ belong to some set in $\mathcal{G}.$

We say that $\mathcal{G}$ is total in $X$ if the linear span of $\bigcup\nolimits_{G \in \mathcal{G}} G$ is dense in $X.$

Theorem—Let $(X, Y, b)$ be a pairing of vector spaces over the field $\mathbb{K}$ and $\mathcal{G}$ be a non-empty collection of $\sigma(X, Y, b)$-bounded subsets of $X.$ Then,

1. If $\mathcal{G}$ covers $X$ then the $\mathcal{G}$-topology on $Y$ is Hausdorff.
2. If $X$ distinguishes points of $Y$ and if $\bigcup\nolimits_{G \in \mathcal{G}} G$ is a $\sigma(X, Y, b)$-dense subset of $X$ then the $\mathcal{G}$-topology on $Y$ is Hausdorff.
3. If $(X, Y, b)$ is a dual system (rather than merely a pairing) then the $\mathcal{G}$-topology on $Y$ is Hausdorff if and only if span of $\bigcup\nolimits_{G \in \mathcal{G}} G$ is dense in $(X,\sigma(X, Y, b)).$

Proof

Proof of (2): If $Y =\{ 0 \}$ then we're done, so assume otherwise. Since the $\mathcal{G}$-topology on $Y$ is a TVS topology, it suffices to show that the set $\{ 0 \}$ is closed in $Y.$ Let $y \in Y$ be non-zero, let $f : X \to \mathbb{K}$ be defined by $f(x) = b(x, y)$ for all $x \in X,$ and let $V = \left\{ s \in \mathbb{K} : | s | > 1 \right\}.$

Since $X$ distinguishes points of $Y,$ there exists some (non-zero) $x \in X$ such that $f(x) \neq 0$ where (since $f$ is surjective) it can be assumed without loss of generality that $|f(x)| > 1.$ The set $U = f^{-1}(V)$ is a $\sigma(X, Y, b)$-open subset of $X$ that is not empty (since it contains $x$). Since $\bigcup\nolimits_{G \in \mathcal{G}} G$ is a $\sigma(X, Y, b)$-dense subset of $X$ there exists some $G \in \mathcal{G}$ and some $g \in G$ such that $g \in U.$ Since $g \in U,$ $| b(g, y) | > 1$ so that $y \not\in G^{\circ},$ where $G^{\circ}$ is a subbasic closed neighborhood of the origin in the $\mathcal{G}$-topology on $Y.$ ■

== Examples of polar topologies induced by a pairing ==
Throughout, $(X, Y, b)$ will be a pairing of vector spaces over the field $\mathbb{K}$ and $\mathcal{G}$ will be a non-empty collection of $\sigma(X, Y, b)$-bounded subsets of $X.$

The following table will omit mention of $b.$ The topologies are listed in an order that roughly corresponds with coarser topologies first and the finer topologies last; note that some of these topologies may be out of order e.g. $c(X, Y, b)$ and the topology below it (i.e. the topology generated by $\sigma(X, Y, b)$-complete and bounded disks) or if $\sigma(X, Y, b)$ is not Hausdorff. If more than one collection of subsets appears the same row in the left-most column then that means that the same polar topology is generated by these collections.

Notation: If $\Delta(Y, X, b)$ denotes a polar topology on $Y$ then $Y$ endowed with this topology will be denoted by $Y_{\Delta(Y, X, b)},$ $Y_{\Delta(Y, X)}$ or simply $Y_{\Delta}.$ For example, if $\sigma(X, Y, b)$ then $\Delta(Y, X, b) = \sigma$ so that $Y_{\sigma(Y, X, b)},$ $Y_{\sigma(Y, X)}$ and $Y_{\sigma}$ all denote $Y$ with endowed with $\sigma(X, Y, b).$

$\mathcal{G} \subseteq \wp(X)$ ("topology of uniform convergence on ...")	Notation	Name ("topology of...")	Alternative name
finite subsets of $X$ (or $\sigma(X, Y, b)$-closed disked hulls of finite subsets of $X$)	$\sigma(X, Y, b)$ $s(X, Y, b)$	pointwise/simple convergence	weak/weak* topology
$\sigma(X, Y, b)$-compact disks	$\tau(X, Y, b)$		Mackey topology
$\sigma(X, Y, b)$-compact convex subsets	$\gamma(X, Y, b)$	compact convex convergence	
$\sigma(X, Y, b)$-compact subsets (or balanced $\sigma(X, Y, b)$-compact subsets)	$c(X, Y, b)$	compact convergence	
$\sigma(X, Y, b)$-complete and bounded disks		convex balanced complete bounded convergence	
$\sigma(X, Y, b)$-precompact/totally bounded subsets (or balanced $\sigma(X, Y, b)$-precompact subsets)		precompact convergence	
$\sigma(X, Y, b)$-infracomplete and bounded disks		convex balanced infracomplete bounded convergence	
$\sigma(X, Y, b)$-bounded subsets	$b(X, Y, b)$ $\beta(X, Y, b)$	bounded convergence	strong topology Strongest polar topology

=== Weak topology σ(Y, X) ===
For any $x \in X,$ a basic $\sigma(Y, X, b)$-neighborhood of $x$ in $X$ is a set of the form:

$$\left\{ z \in X : |b(z-x, y_{i})| \leq r \text{ for all } i \right\}$$

for some real $r > 0$ and some finite set of points $y_1, \ldots, y_n$ in $Y.$

The continuous dual space of $(Y, \sigma(Y, X, b))$ is $X,$ where more precisely, this means that a linear functional $f$ on $Y$ belongs to this continuous dual space if and only if there exists some $x \in X$ such that $f(y) = b(x, y)$ for all $y \in Y.$ The weak topology is the coarsest TVS topology on $Y$ for which this is true.

In general, the convex balanced hull of a $\sigma(Y, X, b)$-compact subset of $Y$ need not be $\sigma(Y, X, b)$-compact.

If $X$ and $Y$ are vector spaces over the complex numbers (which implies that $b$ is complex valued) then let $X_{\mathbb{R}}$ and $Y_{\R}$ denote these spaces when they are considered as vector spaces over the real numbers $\R.$ Let $\operatorname{Re} b$ denote the real part of $b$ and observe that $\left(X_{\mathbb{R}}, Y_{\mathbb{R}}, \operatorname{Re} b\right)$ is a pairing. The weak topology $\sigma(Y, X, b)$ on $Y$ is identical to the weak topology $\sigma\left(X_{\mathbb{R}}, Y_{\mathbb{R}}, \operatorname{Re} b\right).$ This ultimately stems from the fact that for any complex-valued linear functional $f$ on $Y$ with real part $r := \operatorname{Re} f.$ then

$f = r(y) - i r(i y)$ for all $y \in Y.$

=== Mackey topology τ(Y, X) ===
The continuous dual space of $(Y, \tau(Y, X, b))$ is $X$ (in the exact same way as was described for the weak topology). Moreover, the Mackey topology is the finest locally convex topology on $Y$ for which this is true, which is what makes this topology important.

Since in general, the convex balanced hull of a $\sigma(Y, X, b)$-compact subset of $Y$ need not be $\sigma(Y, X, b)$-compact, the Mackey topology may be strictly coarser than the topology $c(X, Y, b).$ Since every $\sigma(Y, X, b)$-compact set is $\sigma(Y, X, b)$-bounded, the Mackey topology is coarser than the strong topology $b(X, Y, b).$

=== Strong topology 𝛽(Y, X) ===
A neighborhood basis (not just a subbasis) at the origin for the $\beta(Y, X, b)$ topology is:

$$\left\{ A^{\circ} ~:~ A \subseteq X \text{ is a } \sigma(X, Y, b)-\text{bounded} \text{ subset of } X \right\}.$$

The strong topology $\beta(Y, X, b)$ is finer than the Mackey topology.

== Polar topologies and topological vector spaces ==
Throughout this section, $X$ will be a topological vector space (TVS) with continuous dual space $X'$ and $(X, X', \langle \cdot, \cdot \rangle)$ will be the canonical pairing, where by definition $\langle x, x' \rangle = x'(x).$ The vector space $X$ always distinguishes/separates the points of $X'$ but $X'$ may fail to distinguishes the points of $X$ (this necessarily happens if, for instance, $X$ is not Hausdorff), in which case the pairing $(X, X', \langle \cdot, \cdot\rangle)$ is not a dual pair. By the Hahn–Banach theorem, if $X$ is a Hausdorff locally convex space then $X'$ separates points of $X$ and thus $(X, X',\langle \cdot, \cdot\rangle)$ forms a dual pair.

=== Properties ===
- If $\bigcup_{G \in \mathcal{G}} G$ covers $X$ then the canonical map from $X$ into $\left(X'_{\mathcal{G}}\right)'$ is well-defined. That is, for all $x \in X$ the evaluation functional on $X'.$ meaning the map $x' \in X' \mapsto \langle x', x \rangle,$ is continuous on $X'_{\mathcal{G}}.$
  - If in addition $X'$ separates points on $X$ then the canonical map of $X$ into $\left(X'_{\mathcal{G}}\right)'$ is an injection.
- Suppose that $u : E \to F$ is a continuous linear and that $\mathcal{G}$ and $\mathcal{H}$ are collections of bounded subsets of $X$ and $Y,$ respectively, that each satisfy axioms $\mathcal{G}_1$ and $\mathcal{G}_2.$ Then the transpose of $u,$ ${}^t u : Y'_{\mathcal{H}} \to X'_{\mathcal{G}}$ is continuous if for every $G \in \mathcal{G}$ there is some $H \in \mathcal{H}$ such that $u(G) \subseteq H.$
  - In particular, the transpose of $u$ is continuous if $X'$ carries the $\sigma(X', X)$ (respectively, $\gamma(X', X),$ $c(X', X),$ $b(X', X)$) topology and $Y'$ carry any topology stronger than the $\sigma(Y', Y)$ topology (respectively, $\gamma(Y', Y),$ $c(Y', Y),$ $b(Y', Y)$).
- If $X$ is a locally convex Hausdorff TVS over the field $\mathbb{K}$ and $\mathcal{G}$ is a collection of bounded subsets of $X$ that satisfies axioms $\mathcal{G}_1$ and $\mathcal{G}_2$ then the bilinear map $X \times X'_{\mathcal{G}} \to \mathbb{K}$ defined by $(x, x') \mapsto \langle x', x \rangle = x'(x)$ is continuous if and only if $X$ is normable and the $\mathcal{G}$-topology on $X'$ is the strong dual topology $b(X', X).$
- Suppose that $X$ is a Fréchet space and $\mathcal{G}$ is a collection of bounded subsets of $X$ that satisfies axioms $\mathcal{G}_1$ and $\mathcal{G}_2.$ If $\mathcal{G}$ contains all compact subsets of $X$ then $X'_{\mathcal{G}}$ is complete.

== Polar topologies on the continuous dual space ==
Throughout, $X$ will be a TVS over the field $\mathbb{K}$ with continuous dual space $X'$ and $X$ and $X'$ will be associated with the canonical pairing. The table below defines many of the most common polar topologies on $X'.$

Notation: If $\Delta(X', Z)$ denotes a polar topology then $X'$ endowed with this topology will be denoted by $X'_{\Delta(X', Z)}$ (e.g. if $\tau(X', X'')$ then $\Delta = \tau$ and $Z = X''$ so that $X'_{\tau(X', X'')}$ denotes $X'$ with endowed with $\tau(X', X'')$).
If in addition, $Z = X$ then this TVS may be denoted by $X'_{\Delta}$ (for example, $X'_{\sigma} := X'_{\sigma(X', X)}$).

$\mathcal{G} \subseteq \wp(X)$ ("topology of uniform convergence on ...")	Notation	Name ("topology of...")	Alternative name
finite subsets of $X$ (or $\sigma(X, X')$-closed disked hulls of finite subsets of $X$)	$\sigma(X', X)$ $s(X', X)$	pointwise/simple convergence	weak/weak* topology
compact convex subsets	$\gamma(X', X)$	compact convex convergence	
compact subsets (or balanced compact subsets)	$c(X', X)$	compact convergence	
$\sigma(X, X')$-compact disks	$\tau(X', X)$		Mackey topology
precompact/totally bounded subsets (or balanced precompact subsets)		precompact convergence	
complete and bounded disks		convex balanced complete bounded convergence	
infracomplete and bounded disks		convex balanced infracomplete bounded convergence	
bounded subsets	$b(X',X)$ $\beta(X',X)$	bounded convergence	strong topology
$\sigma(X'', X')$-compact disks in $X'' := \left(X'_b\right)'$	$\tau(X', X'')$		Mackey topology

The reason why some of the above collections (in the same row) induce the same polar topologies is due to some basic results. A closed subset of a complete TVS is complete and that a complete subset of a Hausdorff and complete TVS is closed. Furthermore, in every TVS, compact subsets are complete and the balanced hull of a compact (resp. totally bounded) subset is again compact (resp. totally bounded). Also, a Banach space can be complete without being weakly complete.

If $B \subseteq X$ is bounded then $B^{\circ}$ is absorbing in $X'$ (note that being absorbing is a necessary condition for $B^{\circ}$ to be a neighborhood of the origin in any TVS topology on $X'$). If $X$ is a locally convex space and $B^{\circ}$ is absorbing in $X'$ then $B$ is bounded in $X.$ Moreover, a subset $S \subseteq X$ is weakly bounded if and only if $S^{\circ}$ is absorbing in $X'.$ For this reason, it is common to restrict attention to families of bounded subsets of $X.$

=== Weak/weak* topology σ(X', X) ===
The $\sigma(X', X)$ topology has the following properties:

- Banach–Alaoglu theorem: Every equicontinuous subset of $X'$ is relatively compact for $\sigma(X', X).$
  - it follows that the $\sigma(X', X)$-closure of the convex balanced hull of an equicontinuous subset of $X'$ is equicontinuous and $\sigma(X', X)$-compact.
- Theorem (S. Banach): Suppose that $X$ and $Y$ are Fréchet spaces or that they are duals of reflexive Fréchet spaces and that $u : X \to Y$ is a continuous linear map. Then $u$ is surjective if and only if the transpose of $u,$ ${}^t u : Y' \to X',$ is one-to-one and the image of ${}^t u$ is weakly closed in $X'_{\sigma(X', X)}.$
- Suppose that $X$ and $Y$ are Fréchet spaces, $Z$ is a Hausdorff locally convex space and that $u : X'_{\sigma} \times Y'_{\sigma} \to Z'_{\sigma}$ is a separately-continuous bilinear map. Then $u : X'_b \times Y'_b \to Z'_b$ is continuous.
  - In particular, any separately continuous bilinear maps from the product of two duals of reflexive Fréchet spaces into a third one is continuous.
- $X'_{\sigma(X', X)}$ is normable if and only if $X$ is finite-dimensional.
- When $X$ is infinite-dimensional the $\sigma(X', X)$ topology on $X'$ is strictly coarser than the strong dual topology $b(X',X).$
- Suppose that $X$ is a locally convex Hausdorff space and that $\hat{X}$ is its completion. If $X \neq \hat{X}$ then $\sigma(X', \hat{X})$ is strictly finer than $\sigma(X', X).$
- Any equicontinuous subset in the dual of a separable Hausdorff locally convex vector space is metrizable in the $\sigma(X', X)$ topology.
- If $X$ is locally convex then a subset $H \subseteq X'$ is $\sigma(X', X)$-bounded if and only if there exists a barrel $B$ in $X$ such that $H \subseteq B^{\circ}.$

=== Compact-convex convergence γ(X', X) ===
If $X$ is a Fréchet space then the topologies $\gamma\left(X', X\right) = c\left(X', X\right).$

=== Compact convergence c(X', X) ===
If $X$ is a Fréchet space or a LF-space then $c(X',X)$ is complete.

Suppose that $X$ is a metrizable topological vector space and that $W' \subseteq X'.$ If the intersection of $W'$ with every equicontinuous subset of $X'$ is weakly-open, then $W'$ is open in $c(X',X).$

=== Precompact convergence ===
Banach–Alaoglu theorem: An equicontinuous subset $K \subseteq X'$ has compact closure in the topology of uniform convergence on precompact sets. Furthermore, this topology on $K$ coincides with the $\sigma(X', X)$ topology.

=== Mackey topology τ(X', X) ===
By letting $\mathcal{G}$ be the set of all convex balanced weakly compact subsets of $X,$ $X'$ will have the Mackey topology on $X'$ or the topology of uniform convergence on convex balanced weakly compact sets, which is denoted by $\tau(X', X)$ and $X'$ with this topology is denoted by $X'_{\tau(X', X)}.$

=== Strong dual topology b(X', X) ===
Due to the importance of this topology, the continuous dual space of $X'_b$ is commonly denoted simply by $X''.$ Consequently, $(X'_b)' = X''.$

The $b(X',X)$ topology has the following properties:

- If $X$ is locally convex, then this topology is finer than all other $\mathcal{G}$-topologies on $X'$ when considering only $\mathcal{G}$'s whose sets are subsets of $X.$
- If $X$ is a bornological space (e.g. metrizable or LF-space) then $X'_{b(X', X)}$ is complete.
- If $X$ is a normed space then the strong dual topology on $X'$ may be defined by the norm $\left\|x'\right\| := \sup_{x \in X, \|x\| = 1} \left|\left\langle x', x \right\rangle\right|,$ where $x' \in X'.$
- If $X$ is a LF-space that is the inductive limit of the sequence of space $X_k$ (for $k = 0,1 \dots$) then $X'_{b(X', X)}$ is a Fréchet space if and only if all $X_k$ are normable.
- If $X$ is a Montel space then
  - $X'_{b(X', X)}$ has the Heine–Borel property (i.e. every closed and bounded subset of $X'_{b(X', X)}$ is compact in $X'_{b(X', X)}$)
  - On bounded subsets of $X'_{b(X', X)},$ the strong and weak topologies coincide (and hence so do all other topologies finer than $\sigma(X', X)$ and coarser than $b(X',X)$).
  - Every weakly convergent sequence in $X'$ is strongly convergent.

=== Mackey topology τ(X, X'') ===
By letting $\mathcal{G}\,'\,'$ be the set of all convex balanced weakly compact subsets of $X'' = \left(X'_b\right)', X'$ will have the Mackey topology on $X'$ induced by $X''$ or the topology of uniform convergence on convex balanced weakly compact subsets of $X''$, which is denoted by $\tau(X', X'')$ and $X'$ with this topology is denoted by $X'_{\tau(X', X'')}.$

- This topology is finer than $b(X', X)$ and hence finer than $\tau(X', X).$

== Polar topologies induced by subsets of the continuous dual space ==
Throughout, $X$ will be a TVS over the field $\mathbb{K}$ with continuous dual space $X'$ and the canonical pairing will be associated with $X$ and $X'.$ The table below defines many of the most common polar topologies on $X.$

Notation: If $\Delta\left(X, X'\right)$ denotes a polar topology on $X$ then $X$ endowed with this topology will be denoted by $X_{\Delta\left(X, X'\right)}$ or $X_{\Delta}$ (e.g. for $\sigma\left(X, X'\right)$ we'd have $\Delta = \sigma$ so that $X_{\sigma(X,X')}$ and $X_{\sigma}$ both denote $X$ with endowed with $\sigma\left(X, X'\right)$).

$\mathcal{G} \subseteq \wp(X)$ ("topology of uniform convergence on ...")	Notation	Name ("topology of...")	Alternative name
finite subsets of $X'$ (or $\sigma(X', Y)$-closed disked hulls of finite subsets of $X'$)	$\sigma\left(X, X'\right)$ $s\left(X, X'\right)$	pointwise/simple convergence	weak topology
equicontinuous subsets (or equicontinuous disks) (or weak-* compact equicontinuous disks)	$\varepsilon(X, X')$	equicontinuous convergence	
weak-* compact disks	$\tau\left(X, X'\right)$		Mackey topology
weak-* compact convex subsets	$\gamma\left(X, X'\right)$	compact convex convergence	
weak-* compact subsets (or balanced weak-* compact subsets)	$c\left(X, X'\right)$	compact convergence	
weak-* bounded subsets	$b\left(X, X'\right)$ $\beta\left(X, X'\right)$	bounded convergence	strong topology

The closure of an equicontinuous subset of $X'$ is weak-* compact and equicontinuous and furthermore, the convex balanced hull of an equicontinuous subset is equicontinuous.

=== Weak topology 𝜎(X, X') ===
Suppose that $X$ and $Y$ are Hausdorff locally convex spaces with $X$ metrizable and that $u:X\to Y$ is a linear map. Then $u:X\to Y$ is continuous if and only if $u : \sigma\left(X, X'\right) \to \sigma\left(Y, Y'\right)$ is continuous. That is, $u : X \to Y$ is continuous when $X$ and $Y$ carry their given topologies if and only if $u$ is continuous when $X$ and $Y$ carry their weak topologies.

=== Convergence on equicontinuous sets 𝜀(X, X') ===
If $\mathcal{G}'$ was the set of all convex balanced weakly compact equicontinuous subsets of $X',$ then the same topology would have been induced.

If $X$ is locally convex and Hausdorff then $X$'s given topology (i.e. the topology that $X$ started with) is exactly $\varepsilon(X, X').$ That is, for $X$ Hausdorff and locally convex, if $E\subset X'$ then $E$ is equicontinuous if and only if $E^{\circ}$ is equicontinuous and furthermore, for any $S \subseteq X,$ $S$ is a neighborhood of the origin if and only if $S^{\circ}$ is equicontinuous.

Importantly, a set of continuous linear functionals $H$ on a TVS $X$ is equicontinuous if and only if it is contained in the polar of some neighborhood $U$ of the origin in $X$ (i.e. $H \subseteq U^{\circ}$). Since a TVS's topology is completely determined by the open neighborhoods of the origin, this means that via operation of taking the polar of a set, the collection of equicontinuous subsets of $X'$ "encode" all information about $X$'s topology (i.e. distinct TVS topologies on $X$ produce distinct collections of equicontinuous subsets, and given any such collection one may recover the TVS original topology by taking the polars of sets in the collection). Thus uniform convergence on the collection of equicontinuous subsets is essentially "convergence on the topology of $X$".

=== Mackey topology τ(X, X') ===
Suppose that $X$ is a locally convex Hausdorff space. If $X$ is metrizable or barrelled then $X$'s original topology is identical to the Mackey topology $\tau\left(X, X'\right).$

==== Topologies compatible with pairings ====
Let $X$ be a vector space and let $Y$ be a vector subspace of the algebraic dual of $X$ that separates points on $X.$ If $\tau$ is any other locally convex Hausdorff topological vector space topology on $X,$ then $\tau$ is compatible with duality between $X$ and $Y$ if when $X$ is equipped with $\tau,$ then it has $Y$ as its continuous dual space. If $X$ is given the weak topology $\sigma(X, Y)$ then $X_{\sigma(X, Y)}$ is a Hausdorff locally convex topological vector space (TVS) and $\sigma(X, Y)$ is compatible with duality between $X$ and $Y$ (i.e. $X_{\sigma(X, Y)}' = \left(X_{\sigma(X, Y)}\right)' = Y$). The question arises: what are all of the locally convex Hausdorff TVS topologies that can be placed on $X$ that are compatible with duality between $X$ and $Y$? The answer to this question is called the Mackey–Arens theorem.

== See also ==
- Dual topology
- List of topologies – List of concrete topologies and topological spaces
- Locally convex topological vector space – Space with topology generated by convex sets
- Polar set – Subset of all points that is bounded by some given point of a dual (in a dual pairing)
- Topologies on spaces of linear maps
- Topology consistent with the duality
- Topological vector space – Vector space with a notion of nearness
