= Biorthogonal system =

Pair of vector spaces

In mathematics, a biorthogonal system is a pair of indexed families of vectors
$$\tilde v_i \text{ in } E \text{ and } \tilde u_i \text{ in } F$$
such that
$$\left\langle\tilde v_i , \tilde u_j\right\rangle = \delta_{i,j},$$
where $E$ and $F$ form a pair of topological vector spaces that are in duality, $\langle \,\cdot, \cdot\, \rangle$ is a bilinear mapping and $\delta_{i,j}$ is the Kronecker delta.

An example is the pair of sets of respectively left and right eigenvectors of a matrix, indexed by eigenvalue, if the eigenvalues are distinct.

A biorthogonal system in which $E = F$ and $\tilde v_i = \tilde u_i$ is an orthonormal system.

== Projection ==
Related to a biorthogonal system is the projection
$$P := \sum_{i \in I} \tilde u_i \otimes \tilde v_i,$$
where $(u \otimes v) (x) := u \langle v, x \rangle;$ its image is the linear span of $\left\{\tilde u_i: i \in I\right\},$ and the kernel is $\left\{\left\langle \tilde v_i, \cdot \right\rangle = 0 : i \in I\right\}.$

== Construction ==
Given a possibly non-orthogonal set of vectors $\mathbf{u} = \left(u_i\right)$ and $\mathbf{v} = \left(v_i\right)$ the projection related is
$$P = \sum_{i,j} u_i \left(\langle\mathbf{v}, \mathbf{u}\rangle^{-1}\right)_{j,i} \otimes v_j,$$
where $\langle\mathbf{v},\mathbf{u}\rangle$ is the matrix with entries $\left(\langle\mathbf{v}, \mathbf{u}\rangle\right)_{i,j} = \left\langle v_i, u_j\right\rangle.$

- $\tilde u_i := (I - P) u_i,$ and $\tilde v_i := (I - P)^* v_i$ then is a biorthogonal system.

== See also ==
- Dual basis – Linear algebra concept
- Dual space – In mathematics, vector space of linear forms
- Dual pair – Dual pair of vector spaces
- Orthogonality – Various meanings of the terms
- Orthogonalization – Process in linear algebra
