= Mackey–Arens theorem =

Theorem in functional analysis

The Mackey–Arens theorem is an important theorem in functional analysis that characterizes those locally convex vector topologies that have some given space of linear functionals as their continuous dual space. According to Narici (2011), this profound result is central to duality theory; a theory that is "the central part of the modern theory of topological vector spaces."

== Prerequisites ==
Let X be a vector space and let Y be a vector subspace of the algebraic dual of X that separates points on X. If 𝜏 is any other locally convex Hausdorff topological vector space topology on X, then we say that 𝜏 is compatible with duality between X and Y if when X is equipped with 𝜏, then it has Y as its continuous dual space. If we give X the weak topology 𝜎(X, Y) then X_{𝜎(X, Y)} is a Hausdorff locally convex topological vector space (TVS) and 𝜎(X, Y) is compatible with duality between X and Y (i.e. $X_{\sigma(X, Y)}^{\prime} = \left( X_{\sigma(X, Y)} \right)^{\prime} = Y$). We can now ask the question: what are all of the locally convex Hausdorff TVS topologies that we can place on X that are compatible with duality between X and Y? The answer to this question is called the Mackey–Arens theorem.

== Mackey–Arens theorem ==
Mackey–Arens theorem—Let X be a vector space and let 𝒯 be a locally convex Hausdorff topological vector space topology on X. Let X' denote the continuous dual space of X and let $X_{\mathcal{T}}$ denote X with the topology 𝒯. Then the following are equivalent:

1. 𝒯 is identical to a $\mathcal{G}^{\prime}$-topology on X, where $\mathcal{G}^{\prime}$ is a covering of <X' consisting of convex, balanced, σ(X', X)-compact sets with the properties that
  1. If $G_1^{\prime}, G_2^{\prime} \in \mathcal{G}^{\prime}$ then there exists a $G^{\prime} \in \mathcal{G}^{\prime}$ such that $G_1^{\prime} \cup G_2^{\prime} \subseteq G^{\prime}$, and
  2. If $G_1^{\prime} \in \mathcal{G}^{\prime}$ and $\lambda$ is a scalar then there exists a $G^{\prime} \in \mathcal{G}^{\prime}$ such that $\lambda G_1^{\prime} \subseteq G^{\prime}$.
2. The continuous dual of $X_{\mathcal{T}}$ is identical to X'.

And furthermore,

1. the topology 𝒯 is identical to the ε(X, X') topology, that is, to the topology of uniform on convergence on the equicontinuous subsets of X'.
2. the Mackey topology τ(X, X') is the finest locally convex Hausdorff TVS topology on X that is compatible with duality between X and $X_{\mathcal{T}}^{\prime}$, and
3. the weak topology σ(X, X') is the coarsest locally convex Hausdorff TVS topology on X that is compatible with duality between X and $X_{\mathcal{T}}^{\prime}$.

== See also ==
- Dual system
- Mackey topology
- Polar topology

== Sources ==
- Rudin, Walter (1991). Functional Analysis. International Series in Pure and Applied Mathematics. Vol. 8 (Second ed.). New York, NY: McGraw-Hill Science/Engineering/Math. ISBN 978-0-07-054236-5. OCLC 21163277.
- Narici, Lawrence; Beckenstein, Edward (2011). Topological Vector Spaces. Pure and applied mathematics (Second ed.). Boca Raton, FL: CRC Press. ISBN 978-1584888666. OCLC 144216834.
- Schaefer, Helmut H.; Wolff, Manfred P. (1999). Topological Vector Spaces. GTM. Vol. 8 (Second ed.). New York, NY: Springer New York Imprint Springer. ISBN 978-1-4612-7155-0. OCLC 840278135.
- Trèves, François (2006) [1967]. Topological Vector Spaces, Distributions and Kernels. Mineola, N.Y.: Dover Publications. ISBN 978-0-486-45352-1. OCLC 853623322.
