= Dual system =

Dual pair of vector spaces

In mathematics, a dual system, dual pair or a duality over a field $\mathbb{K}$ is a triple $(X, Y, b)$ consisting of two vector spaces, $X$ and $Y$, over $\mathbb{K}$ and a non-degenerate bilinear map $b : X \times Y \to \mathbb{K}$.

In mathematics, duality is the study of dual systems and is important in functional analysis. Duality plays crucial roles in quantum mechanics because it has extensive applications to the theory of Hilbert spaces.

== Definition, notation, and conventions ==
=== Pairings ===
A pairing or pair over a field $\mathbb{K}$ is a triple $(X, Y, b),$ which may also be denoted by $b(X, Y),$ consisting of two vector spaces $X$ and $Y$ over $\mathbb{K}$ and a bilinear map $b : X \times Y \to \mathbb{K}$ called the bilinear map associated with the pairing, or more simply called the pairing's map or its bilinear form. The examples here only describe when $\mathbb{K}$ is either the real numbers $\R$ or the complex numbers $\Complex$, but the mathematical theory is general.

For every $x \in X$, define
$$\begin{alignat}{4}
b(x, \,\cdot\,) : \,& Y && \to     &&\, \mathbb{K} \\
& y && \mapsto &&\, b(x, y)
\end{alignat}$$
and for every $y \in Y,$ define
$$\begin{alignat}{4}
b(\,\cdot\,, y) : \,& X && \to     &&\, \mathbb{K} \\
& x && \mapsto &&\, b(x, y).
\end{alignat}$$
Every $b(x, \,\cdot\,)$ is a linear functional on $Y$ and every $b(\,\cdot\,, y)$ is a linear functional on $X$. Therefore both
$$b(X, \,\cdot\,) := \{ b(x, \,\cdot\,) : x \in X \} \qquad \text{ and } \qquad b(\,\cdot\,, Y) := \{ b(\,\cdot\,, y) : y \in Y \},$$
form vector spaces of linear functionals.

It is common practice to write $\langle x, y \rangle$ instead of $b(x, y)$, in which in some cases the pairing may be denoted by $\left\langle X, Y \right\rangle$ rather than $(X, Y, \langle \cdot, \cdot \rangle)$. However, this article will reserve the use of $\langle \cdot, \cdot \rangle$ for the canonical evaluation map (defined below) so as to avoid confusion for readers not familiar with this subject.

=== Dual pairings ===
A pairing $(X, Y, b)$ is called a dual system, a dual pair, or a duality over $\mathbb{K}$ if the bilinear form $b$ is non-degenerate, which means that it satisfies the following two separation axioms:

1. $Y$ separates (distinguishes) points of $X$: if $x \in X$ is such that $b(x, \,\cdot\,) = 0$ then $x = 0$; or equivalently, for all non-zero $x \in X$, the map $b(x, \,\cdot\,) : Y \to \mathbb{K}$ is not identically $0$ (i.e. there exists a $y \in Y$ such that $b(x, y) \neq 0$ for each $x \in X$);
2. $X$ separates (distinguishes) points of $Y$: if $y \in Y$ is such that $b(\,\cdot\,, y) = 0$ then $y = 0$; or equivalently, for all non-zero $y \in Y,$ the map $b(\,\cdot\,, y) : X \to \mathbb{K}$ is not identically $0$ (i.e. there exists an $x \in X$ such that $b(x, y) \neq 0$ for each $y \in Y$).

In this case $b$ is non-degenerate, and one can say that $b$ places $X$ and $Y$ in duality (or, redundantly but explicitly, in separated duality), and $b$ is called the duality pairing of the triple $(X, Y, b)$.

=== Total subsets ===
A subset $S$ of $Y$ is called total if for every $x \in X$,
$$b(x, s) = 0 \quad \text{ for all } s \in S$$
implies $x = 0.$ A total subset of $X$ is defined analogously (see footnote). (Note: A subset $S$ of $X$ is total if for all $y \in Y$, $$b(s, y) = 0 \quad \text{ for all } s \in S$$ implies $y = 0$.) Thus $X$ separates points of $Y$ if and only if $X$ is a total subset of $X$, and similarly for $Y$.

=== Orthogonality ===
The vectors $x$ and $y$ are orthogonal, written $x \perp y$, if $b(x, y) = 0$. Two subsets $R \subseteq X$ and $S \subseteq Y$ are orthogonal, written $R \perp S$, if $b(R, S) = \{ 0 \}$; that is, if $b(r, s) = 0$ for all $r \in R$ and $s \in S$. The definition of a subset being orthogonal to a vector is defined analogously.

The orthogonal complement or annihilator of a subset $R \subseteq X$ is
$$R^{\perp} := \{ y \in Y : R \perp y \} := \{ y \in Y : b(R, y) = \{ 0 \} \}$$
Thus $R$ is a total subset of $X$ if and only if $R^\perp$ equals $\{0\}$.

=== Polar sets ===
Given a triple $(X, Y, b)$ defining a pairing over $\mathbb{K}$, the absolute polar set or polar set of a subset $A$ of $X$ is the set:
$$A^{\circ} := \left\{ y \in Y : \sup_{x \in A} |b(x, y)| \leq 1 \right\}.$$
Symmetrically, the absolute polar set or polar set of a subset $B$ of $Y$ is denoted by $B^{\circ}$ and defined by
$$B^{\circ} := \left\{ x \in X : \sup_{y \in B} |b(x, y)| \leq 1 \right\}.$$

To use bookkeeping that helps keep track of the anti-symmetry of the two sides of the duality, the absolute polar of a subset $B$ of $Y$ may also be called the absolute prepolar or prepolar of $B$ and then may be denoted by $^{\circ}B$.

The polar $B^{\circ}$ is necessarily a convex set containing $0 \in Y$ where if $B$ is balanced then so is $B^{\circ}$ and if $B$ is a vector subspace of $X$ then so too is $B^{\circ}$ a vector subspace of $Y.$

If $A$ is a vector subspace of $X,$ then $A^{\circ} = A^{\perp}$ and this is also equal to the real polar of $A.$ If $A \subseteq X$ then the bipolar of $A$, denoted $A^{\circ\circ}$, is the polar of the orthogonal complement of $A$, i.e., the set ${}^{\circ}\left(A^{\perp}\right).$ Similarly, if $B \subseteq Y$ then the bipolar of $B$ is $B^{\circ\circ} := \left({}^{\circ}B\right)^{\circ}.$

=== Dual definitions and results ===
Given a pairing $(X, Y, b),$ define a new pairing $(Y, X, d)$ where $d(y, x) := b(x, y)$ for all $x \in X$ and $y \in Y$.

There is a consistent theme in duality theory that any definition for a pairing $(X, Y, b)$ has a corresponding dual definition for the pairing $(Y, X, d).$

Convention and Definition: Given any definition for a pairing $(X, Y, b),$ one obtains a dual definition by applying it to the pairing $(Y, X, d).$ These conventions also apply to theorems.

For instance, if "$X$ distinguishes points of $Y$" (resp, "$S$ is a total subset of $Y$") is defined as above, then this convention immediately produces the dual definition of "$Y$ distinguishes points of $X$" (resp, "$S$ is a total subset of $X$").

This following notation is almost ubiquitous and allows us to avoid assigning a symbol to $d.$

Convention and Notation: If a definition and its notation for a pairing $(X, Y, b)$ depends on the order of $X$ and $Y$ (for example, the definition of the Mackey topology $\tau(X, Y, b)$ on $X$) then by switching the order of $X$ and $Y,$ then it is meant that definition applied to $(Y, X, d)$ (continuing the same example, the topology $\tau(Y, X, b)$ would actually denote the topology $\tau(Y, X, d)$).

For another example, once the weak topology on $X$ is defined, denoted by $\sigma(X, Y, b)$, then this dual definition would automatically be applied to the pairing $(Y, X, d)$ so as to obtain the definition of the weak topology on $Y$, and this topology would be denoted by $\sigma(Y, X, b)$ rather than $\sigma(Y, X, d)$.

==== Identification of $(X, Y)$ with $(Y, X)$ ====
Although it is technically incorrect and an abuse of notation, this article will adhere to the nearly ubiquitous convention of treating a pairing $(X, Y, b)$ interchangeably with $(Y, X, d)$ and also of denoting $(Y, X, d)$ by $(Y, X, b).$

== Examples ==
=== Restriction of a pairing ===
Suppose that $(X, Y, b)$ is a pairing, $M$ is a vector subspace of $X,$ and $N$ is a vector subspace of $Y$. Then the restriction of $(X, Y, b)$ to $M \times N$ is the pairing $\left(M, N, b\big\vert_{M \times N}\right).$ If $(X, Y, b)$ is a duality, then it's possible for a restriction to fail to be a duality (e.g. if $Y \neq \{ 0 \}$ and $N = \{ 0 \}$).

This article will use the common practice of denoting the restriction $\left(M, N, b\big\vert_{M \times N}\right)$ by $(M, N, b).$

=== Canonical duality on a vector space ===
Suppose that $X$ is a vector space and let $X^{\#}$ denote the algebraic dual space of $X$ (that is, the space of all linear functionals on $X$). There is a canonical duality $\left(X, X^{\#}, c\right)$ where $c\left(x, x^{\prime}\right) = \left\langle x, x^{\prime} \right\rangle = x^{\prime}(x),$ which is called the evaluation map or the natural or canonical bilinear functional on $X \times X^{\#}.$ Note in particular that for any $x^{\prime} \in X^{\#},$ $c\left(\,\cdot\,, x^{\prime}\right)$ is just another way of denoting $x^{\prime}$; i.e. $c\left(\,\cdot\,, x^{\prime}\right) = x^{\prime}(\,\cdot\,) = x^{\prime}.$

If $N$ is a vector subspace of $X^{\#}$, then the restriction of $\left(X, X^{\#}, c\right)$ to $X \times N$ is called the canonical pairing where if this pairing is a duality then it is instead called the canonical duality. Clearly, $X$ always distinguishes points of $N$, so the canonical pairing is a dual system if and only if $N$ separates points of $X.$ The following notation is now nearly ubiquitous in duality theory.

The evaluation map will be denoted by $\left\langle x, x^{\prime} \right\rangle = x^{\prime}(x)$ (rather than by $c$) and $\langle X, N \rangle$ will be written rather than $(X, N, c).$

Assumption: As is common practice, if $X$ is a vector space and $N$ is a vector space of linear functionals on $X,$ then unless stated otherwise, it will be assumed that they are associated with the canonical pairing $\langle X, N \rangle.$

If $N$ is a vector subspace of $X^{\#}$ then $X$ distinguishes points of $N$ (or equivalently, $(X, N, c)$ is a duality) if and only if $N$ distinguishes points of $X,$ or equivalently if $N$ is total (that is, $n(x) = 0$ for all $n \in N$ implies $x = 0$).

=== Canonical duality on a topological vector space ===
Suppose $X$ is a topological vector space (TVS) with continuous dual space $X^{\prime}.$ Then the restriction of the canonical duality $\left(X, X^{\#}, c\right)$ to $X$ × $X^{\prime}$ defines a pairing $\left(X, X^{\prime}, c\big\vert_{X \times X^{\prime}}\right)$ for which $X$ separates points of $X^{\prime}.$ If $X^{\prime}$ separates points of $X$ (which is true if, for instance, $X$ is a Hausdorff locally convex space) then this pairing forms a duality.

Assumption: As is commonly done, whenever $X$ is a TVS, then unless indicated otherwise, it will be assumed without comment that it's associated with the canonical pairing $\left\langle X, X^{\prime} \right\rangle.$

=== Polars and duals of TVSs ===
The following result shows that the continuous linear functionals on a TVS are exactly those linear functionals that are bounded on a neighborhood of the origin.

Theorem—Let $X$ be a TVS with algebraic dual $X^{\#}$ and let $\mathcal{N}$ be a basis of neighborhoods of $X$ at the origin. Under the canonical duality $\left\langle X, X^{\#} \right\rangle,$ the continuous dual space of $X$ is the union of all $N^{\circ}$ as $N$ ranges over $\mathcal{N}$ (where the polars are taken in $X^{\#}$).

=== Inner product spaces and complex conjugate spaces ===
A pre-Hilbert space $(H, \langle \cdot, \cdot \rangle)$ is a dual pairing if and only if $H$ is vector space over $\R$ or $H$ has dimension $0.$ Here it is assumed that the sesquilinear form $\langle \cdot, \cdot \rangle$ is conjugate homogeneous in its second coordinate and homogeneous in its first coordinate.

- If $(H, \langle \cdot, \cdot \rangle)$ is a real Hilbert space then $(H, H, \langle \cdot, \cdot \rangle)$ forms a dual system.
- If $(H, \langle \cdot, \cdot \rangle)$ is a complex Hilbert space then $(H, H, \langle \cdot, \cdot \rangle)$ forms a dual system if and only if $\operatorname{dim} H = 0.$ If $H$ is non-trivial then $(H, H, \langle \cdot, \cdot \rangle)$ does not even form pairing since the inner product is sesquilinear rather than bilinear.

Suppose that $(H, \langle \cdot, \cdot \rangle)$ is a complex pre-Hilbert space with scalar multiplication denoted as usual by juxtaposition or by a dot $\cdot.$ Define the map
$$\,\cdot\, \perp \,\cdot\, : \Complex \times H \to H \quad \text{ by } \quad c \perp x := \overline{c} x,$$
where the right-hand side uses the scalar multiplication of $H.$ Let $\overline{H}$ denote the complex conjugate vector space of $H,$ where $\overline{H}$ denotes the additive group of $(H, +)$ (so vector addition in $\overline{H}$ is identical to vector addition in $H$) but with scalar multiplication in $\overline{H}$ being the map $\,\cdot\, \perp \,\cdot\,$ (instead of the scalar multiplication that $H$ is endowed with).

The map $b : H \times \overline{H} \to \Complex$ defined by $b(x, y) := \langle x, y \rangle$ is linear in both coordinates (Note: That $b$ is linear in its first coordinate is obvious. Suppose $c$ is a scalar. Then $b(x, c \perp y) = b\left(x, \overline{c} y\right) = \langle x, \overline{c} y \rangle = c \langle x, y \rangle = c b(x, y),$ which shows that $b$ is linear in its second coordinate.) and so $\left(H, \overline{H}, \langle \cdot, \cdot \rangle\right)$ forms a dual pairing.

=== Other examples ===
- Suppose $X = \R^2,$ $Y = \R^3,$ and for all $\left(x_1, y_1\right) \in X \text{ and } \left(x_2, y_2, z_2\right) \in Y,$ let
  $$b\left(\left(x_1, y_1\right), \left(x_2, y_2, z_2\right)\right) := x_1 x_2 + y_1 y_2.$$
  Then $(X, Y, b)$ is a pairing such that $X$ distinguishes points of $Y,$ but $Y$ does not distinguish points of $X.$ Furthermore, $X^{\perp} := \{y \in Y : X \perp y\} = \{(0, 0, z) : z \in \R\}.$
- Let $0 < p < \infty,$ $X := L^p(\mu),$ $Y := L^q(\mu)$ (where $q$ is such that $\tfrac{1}{p} + \tfrac{1}{q} = 1$), and $b(f, g) := \int f g \, \mathrm{d}\mu.$ Then $(X, Y, b)$ is a dual system.
- Let $X$ and $Y$ be vector spaces over the same field $\mathbb{K}.$ Then the bilinear form $b\left(x \otimes y, x^* \otimes y^*\right) = \left\langle x^{\prime}, x \right\rangle \left\langle y^{\prime}, y \right\rangle$ places $X \times Y$ and $X^{\#} \times Y^{\#}$ in duality.
- A sequence space $X$ and its beta dual $Y := X^{\beta}$ with the bilinear map defined as $\langle x, y \rangle := \sum_{i=1}^{\infty} x_i y_i$ for $x \in X,$ $y \in X^{\beta}$ forms a dual system.

== Weak topology ==
Suppose that $(X, Y, b)$ is a pairing of vector spaces over $\mathbb{K}.$ If $S \subseteq Y$ then the weak topology on $X$ induced by $S$ (and $b$) is the weakest TVS topology on $X,$ denoted by $\sigma(X, S, b)$ or simply $\sigma(X, S),$ making each map $b(\,\cdot\,, y) : X \to \mathbb{K}$ continuous as a function of $x$ for every $y \in S$. If $S$ is not clear from context then it should be assumed to be all of $Y,$ in which case it is called the weak topology on $X$ (induced by $Y$). The notation $X_{\sigma(X, S, b)},$ $X_{\sigma(X, S)},$ or (if no confusion could arise) simply $X_{\sigma}$ is used to denote $X$ endowed with the weak topology $\sigma(X, S, b).$ Importantly, the weak topology depends entirely on the function $b,$ the usual topology on $\Complex,$ and $X$'s vector space structure but not on the algebraic structures of $Y.$

Similarly, if $R \subseteq X$ then the dual definition of the weak topology on $Y$ induced by $R$ (and $b$), which is denoted by $\sigma(Y, R, b)$ or simply $\sigma(Y, R)$ (see footnote for details). (Note: The weak topology on $Y$ is the weakest TVS topology on $Y$ making all maps $b(x, \,\cdot\,) : Y \to \mathbb{K}$ continuous, as $x$ ranges over $R.$ The dual notation of $(Y, \sigma(Y, R, b)),$ $(Y, \sigma(Y, R)),$ or simply $(Y, \sigma)$ may also be used to denote $Y$ endowed with the weak topology $\sigma(Y, R, b).$ If $R$ is not clear from context then it should be assumed to be all of $X,$ in which case it is simply called the weak topology on $Y$ (induced by $X$).)

Definition and Notation: If "$\sigma(X, Y, b)$" is attached to a topological definition (e.g. $\sigma(X, Y, b)$-converges, $\sigma(X, Y, b)$-bounded, $\operatorname{cl}_{\sigma(X, Y, b)}(S),$ etc.) then it means that definition when the first space (i.e. $X$) carries the $\sigma(X, Y, b)$ topology. Mention of $b$ or even $X$ and $Y$ may be omitted if no confusion arises. So, for instance, if a sequence $\left(a_i\right)_{i=1}^{\infty}$ in $Y$ "$\sigma$-converges" or "weakly converges" then this means that it converges in $(Y, \sigma(Y, X, b))$ whereas if it were a sequence in $X$, then this would mean that it converges in $(X, \sigma(X, Y, b))$).

The topology $\sigma(X, Y, b)$ is locally convex since it is determined by the family of seminorms $p_y : X \to \R$ defined by $p_y(x) := |b(x, y)|,$ as $y$ ranges over $Y.$ If $x \in X$ and $\left(x_i\right)_{i \in I}$ is a net in $X,$ then $\left(x_i\right)_{i \in I}$ $\sigma(X, Y, b)$-converges to $x$ if $\left(x_i\right)_{i \in I}$ converges to $x$ in $(X, \sigma(X, Y, b)).$ A net $\left(x_i\right)_{i \in I}$ $\sigma(X, Y, b)$-converges to $x$ if and only if for all $y \in Y,$ $b\left(x_i, y\right)$ converges to $b(x, y).$ If $\left(x_i\right)_{i=1}^{\infty}$ is a sequence of orthonormal vectors in Hilbert space, then $\left(x_i\right)_{i=1}^{\infty}$ converges weakly to 0 but does not norm-converge to 0 (or any other vector).

If $(X, Y, b)$ is a pairing and $N$ is a proper vector subspace of $Y$ such that $(X, N, b)$ is a dual pair, then $\sigma(X, N, b)$ is strictly coarser than $\sigma(X, Y, b).$

=== Bounded subsets ===
A subset $S$ of $X$ is $\sigma(X, Y, b)$-bounded if and only if
$$\sup_{} |b(S, y)| < \infty \quad \text{ for all } y \in Y,$$
where $b(S, y) := \{ b(s, y) : s \in S \}.$

=== Hausdorffness ===
If $(X, Y, b)$ is a pairing then the following are equivalent:

1. $X$ distinguishes points of $Y$;
2. The map $y \mapsto b(\,\cdot\,, y)$ defines an injection from $Y$ into the algebraic dual space of $X$;
3. $\sigma(Y, X, b)$ is Hausdorff.

=== Weak representation theorem ===
The following theorem is of fundamental importance to duality theory because it completely characterizes the continuous dual space of $(X, \sigma(X, Y, b)).$

Weak representation theorem—Let $(X, Y, b)$ be a pairing over the field $\mathbb{K}.$ Then the continuous dual space of $(X, \sigma(X, Y, b))$ is
$$b(\,\cdot\,, Y) := \{b(\,\cdot\,, y) : y \in Y\}.$$
Furthermore,

1. If $f$ is a continuous linear functional on $(X, \sigma(X, Y, b))$ then there exists some $y \in Y$ such that $f = b(\,\cdot\,, y)$; if such a $y$ exists then it is unique if and only if $X$ distinguishes points of $Y.$
  - Note that whether or not $X$ distinguishes points of $Y$ is not dependent on the particular choice of $y.$
2. The continuous dual space of $(X, \sigma(X, Y, b))$ may be identified with the quotient space $Y / X^{\perp},$ where $X^{\perp} := \{y \in Y : b(x, y) = 0 \text{ for all } x \in X\}.$
  - This is true regardless of whether or not $X$ distinguishes points of $Y$ or $Y$ distinguishes points of $X.$

Consequently, the continuous dual space of $(X, \sigma(X, Y, b))$ is
$$(X, \sigma(X, Y, b))^{\prime} = b(\,\cdot\,, Y) := \left\{ b(\,\cdot\,, y) : y \in Y \right\}.$$

With respect to the canonical pairing, if $X$ is a TVS whose continuous dual space $X^{\prime}$ separates points on $X$ (i.e. such that $\left(X, \sigma\left(X, X^{\prime}\right)\right)$ is Hausdorff, which implies that $X$ is also necessarily Hausdorff) then the continuous dual space of $\left(X^{\prime}, \sigma\left(X^{\prime}, X\right)\right)$ is equal to the set of all "evaluation at a point $x$" maps as $x$ ranges over $X$ (i.e. the map that send $x^{\prime} \in X^{\prime}$ to $x^{\prime}(x)$). This is commonly written as
$$\left(X^{\prime}, \sigma\left(X^{\prime}, X\right)\right)^{\prime} = X \qquad \text{ or } \qquad \left(X^{\prime}_{\sigma}\right)^{\prime} = X.$$
This very important fact is why results for polar topologies on continuous dual spaces, such as the strong dual topology $\beta\left(X^{\prime}, X\right)$ on $X^{\prime}$ for example, can also often be applied to the original TVS $X$; for instance, $X$ being identified with $\left(X^{\prime}_{\sigma}\right)^{\prime}$ means that the topology $\beta\left(\left(X^{\prime}_{\sigma}\right)^{\prime}, X^{\prime}_{\sigma}\right)$ on $\left(X^{\prime}_{\sigma}\right)^{\prime}$ can instead be thought of as a topology on $X.$ Moreover, if $X^{\prime}$ is endowed with a topology that is finer than $\sigma\left(X^{\prime}, X\right)$ then the continuous dual space of $X^{\prime}$ will necessarily contain $\left(X^{\prime}_{\sigma}\right)^{\prime}$ as a subset. So for instance, when $X^{\prime}$ is endowed with the strong dual topology (and so is denoted by $X^{\prime}_{\beta}$) then
$$\left(X^{\prime}_{\beta}\right)^{\prime} ~\supseteq~ \left(X^{\prime}_{\sigma}\right)^{\prime} ~=~ X$$
which (among other things) allows for $X$ to be endowed with the subspace topology induced on it by, say, the strong dual topology $\beta\left(\left(X^{\prime}_{\beta}\right)^{\prime}, X^{\prime}_{\beta}\right)$ (this topology is also called the strong bidual topology and it appears in the theory of reflexive spaces: the Hausdorff locally convex TVS $X$ is said to be semi-reflexive if $\left(X^{\prime}_{\beta}\right)^{\prime} = X$ and it will be called reflexive if in addition the strong bidual topology $\beta\left(\left(X^{\prime}_{\beta}\right)^{\prime}, X^{\prime}_{\beta}\right)$ on $X$ is equal to $X$'s original/starting topology).

=== Orthogonals, quotients, and subspaces ===
If $(X, Y, b)$ is a pairing then for any subset $S$ of $X$:

- $S^{\perp} = (\operatorname{span} S)^{\perp} = \left(\operatorname{cl}_{\sigma(Y, X, b)} \operatorname{span} S\right)^{\perp} = S^{\perp\perp\perp}$ and this set is $\sigma(Y, X, b)$-closed;
- $S \subseteq S^{\perp\perp} = \left(\operatorname{cl}_{\sigma(X, Y, b)} \operatorname{span} S\right)$;
  - Thus if $S$ is a $\sigma(X, Y, b)$-closed vector subspace of $X$ then $S \subseteq S^{\perp\perp}.$
- If $\left(S_i\right)_{i \in I}$ is a family of $\sigma(X, Y, b)$-closed vector subspaces of $X$ then
  $$\left(\bigcap_{i \in I} S_i\right)^{\perp} = \operatorname{cl}_{\sigma(Y, X, b)} \left(\operatorname{span} \left(\bigcup_{i \in I} S_i^{\perp}\right)\right).$$
- If $\left(S_i\right)_{i \in I}$ is a family of subsets of $X$ then $\left(\bigcup_{i \in I} S_i\right)^{\perp} = \bigcap_{i \in I} S_i^{\perp}.$

If $X$ is a normed space then under the canonical duality, $S^{\perp}$ is norm closed in $X^{\prime}$ and $S^{\perp\perp}$ is norm closed in $X.$

=== Subspaces ===
Suppose that $M$ is a vector subspace of $X$ and let $(M, Y, b)$ denote the restriction of $(X, Y, b)$ to $M \times Y.$ The weak topology $\sigma(M, Y, b)$ on $M$ is identical to the subspace topology that $M$ inherits from $(X, \sigma(X, Y, b)).$

Also, $\left(M, Y / M^{\perp}, b\big\vert_M\right)$ is a paired space (where $Y / M^{\perp}$ means $Y / \left(M^{\perp}\right)$) where $b\big\vert_M : M \times Y / M^{\perp} \to \mathbb{K}$ is defined by
$$\left(m, y + M^{\perp}\right) \mapsto b(m, y).$$

The topology $\sigma\left(M, Y / M^{\perp}, b\big\vert_M\right)$ is equal to the subspace topology that $M$ inherits from $(X, \sigma(X, Y, b)).$ Furthermore, if $(X, \sigma(X, Y, b))$ is a dual system then so is $\left(M, Y / M^{\perp}, b\big\vert_M\right).$

=== Quotients ===
Suppose that $M$ is a vector subspace of $X.$ Then $\left(X / M, M^{\perp}, b / M\right)$ is a paired space where $b / M : X / M \times M^{\perp} \to \mathbb{K}$ is defined by
$$(x + M, y) \mapsto b(x, y).$$

The topology $\sigma\left(X / M, M^{\perp}\right)$ is identical to the usual quotient topology induced by $(X, \sigma(X, Y, b))$ on $X / M.$

=== Polars and the weak topology ===
If $X$ is a locally convex space and if $H$ is a subset of the continuous dual space $X^{\prime},$ then $H$ is $\sigma\left(X^{\prime}, X\right)$-bounded if and only if $H \subseteq B^{\circ}$ for some barrel $B$ in $X.$

The following results are important for defining polar topologies.

If $(X, Y, b)$ is a pairing and $A \subseteq X,$ then:

1. The polar $A^{\circ}$ of $A$ is a closed subset of $(Y, \sigma(Y, X, b)).$
2. The polars of the following sets are identical: (a) $A$; (b) the convex hull of $A$; (c) the balanced hull of $A$; (d) the $\sigma(X, Y, b)$-closure of $A$; (e) the $\sigma(X, Y, b)$-closure of the convex balanced hull of $A.$
3. The bipolar theorem: The bipolar of $A,$ denoted by $A^{\circ\circ},$ is equal to the $\sigma(X, Y, b)$-closure of the convex balanced hull of $A.$
  - The bipolar theorem in particular "is an indispensable tool in working with dualities."
4. $A$ is $\sigma(X, Y, b)$-bounded if and only if $A^{\circ}$ is absorbing in $Y.$
5. If in addition $Y$ distinguishes points of $X$ then $A$ is $\sigma(X, Y, b)$-bounded if and only if it is $\sigma(X, Y, b)$-totally bounded.

If $(X, Y, b)$ is a pairing and $\tau$ is a locally convex topology on $X$ that is consistent with duality, then a subset $B$ of $X$ is a barrel in $(X, \tau)$ if and only if $B$ is the polar of some $\sigma(Y, X, b)$-bounded subset of $Y.$

== Transposes ==
=== Transposes of a linear map with respect to pairings ===
Let $(X, Y, b)$ and $(W, Z, c)$ be pairings over $\mathbb{K}$ and let $F : X \to W$ be a linear map.

For all $z \in Z,$ let $c(F(\,\cdot\,), z) : X \to \mathbb{K}$ be the map defined by $x \mapsto c(F(x), z).$ It is said that $F$'s transpose or adjoint is well-defined if the following conditions are satisfied:

1. $X$ distinguishes points of $Y$ (or equivalently, the map $y \mapsto b(\,\cdot\,, y)$ from $Y$ into the algebraic dual $X^{\#}$ is injective), and
2. $c(F(\,\cdot\,), Z) \subseteq b(\,\cdot\,, Y),$ where $c(F(\,\cdot\,), Z) := \{ c(F(\,\cdot\,), z) : z \in Z \}$ and $b(\,\cdot\,, Y) := \{ b(\,\cdot\,, y) : y \in Y \}$.

In this case, for any $z \in Z$ there exists (by condition 2) a unique (by condition 1) $y \in Y$ such that $c(F(\,\cdot\,), z) = b(\,\cdot\,, y)$), where this element of $Y$ will be denoted by ${}^t F(z).$ This defines a linear map
$${}^t F : Z \to Y$$

called the transpose or adjoint of $F$ with respect to $(X, Y, b)$ and $(W, Z, c)$ (this should not be confused with the Hermitian adjoint). It is easy to see that the two conditions mentioned above (i.e. for "the transpose is well-defined") are also necessary for ${}^t F$ to be well-defined. For every $z \in Z,$ the defining condition for ${}^t F(z)$ is
$$c(F(\,\cdot\,), z) = b\left(\,\cdot\,, {}^t F(z)\right),$$
that is,
$$c(F(x), z) = b\left(x, {}^t F(z)\right)$$
for all $x \in X.$

By the conventions mentioned at the beginning of this article, this also defines the transpose of linear maps of the form $Z \to Y,$ (Note: If $G : Z \to Y$ is a linear map then $G$'s transpose, ${}^t G : X \to W,$ is well-defined if and only if $Z$ distinguishes points of $W$ and $b(X, G(\,\cdot\,)) \subseteq c(W, \,\cdot\,).$ In this case, for each $x \in X,$ the defining condition for ${}^t G(x)$ is: $c(x, G(\,\cdot\,)) = c\left({}^t G(x), \,\cdot\,\right).$) $X \to Z,$ (Note: If $H : X \to Z$ is a linear map then $H$'s transpose, ${}^t H : W \to Y,$ is well-defined if and only if $X$ distinguishes points of $Y$ and $c(W, H(\,\cdot\,)) \subseteq b(\,\cdot\,, Y).$ In this case, for each $w \in W,$ the defining condition for ${}^t H(w)$ is: $c(w, H(\,\cdot\,)) = b\left(\,\cdot\,, {}^t H(w)\right).$) $W \to Y,$ (Note: If $H : W \to Y$ is a linear map then $H$'s transpose, ${}^t H : X \to Q,$ is well-defined if and only if $W$ distinguishes points of $Z$ and $b(X, H(\,\cdot\,)) \subseteq c(\,\cdot\,, Z).$ In this case, for each $x \in X,$ the defining condition for ${}^t H(x)$ is: $c(x, H(\,\cdot\,)) = b\left(\,\cdot\,, {}^t H(x)\right).$) $Y \to W,$ (Note: If $H : Y \to W$ is a linear map then $H$'s transpose, ${}^t H : Z \to X,$ is well-defined if and only if $Y$ distinguishes points of $X$ and $c(H(\,\cdot\,), Z) \subseteq b(X, \,\cdot\,).$ In this case, for each $z \in Z,$ the defining condition for ${}^t H(z)$ is: $c(H(\,\cdot\,), z) = b\left({}^t H(z), \,\cdot\,\right)$) etc. (see footnote).

=== Properties of the transpose ===
Throughout, $(X, Y, b)$ and $(W, Z, c)$ be pairings over $\mathbb{K}$ and $F : X \to W$ will be a linear map whose transpose ${}^t F : Z \to Y$ is well-defined.

- ${}^t F : Z \to Y$ is injective (i.e. $\operatorname{ker} {}^t F = \{ 0 \}$) if and only if the range of $F$ is dense in $\left(W, \sigma\left(W, Z, c\right)\right).$
- If in addition to ${}^t F$ being well-defined, the transpose of ${}^t F$ is also well-defined then ${}^{tt} F = F.$
- Suppose $(U, V, a)$ is a pairing over $\mathbb{K}$ and $E : U \to X$ is a linear map whose transpose ${}^t E : Y \to V$ is well-defined. Then the transpose of $F \circ E : U \to W,$ which is ${}^t (F \circ E) : Z \to V,$ is well-defined and ${}^t (F \circ E) = {}^t E \circ {}^t F.$
- If $F : X \to W$ is a vector space isomorphism then ${}^t F : Z \to Y$ is bijective, the transpose of $F^{-1} : W \to X,$ which is ${}^t \left(F^{-1}\right) : Y \to Z,$ is well-defined, and ${}^t \left(F^{-1}\right) = \left({}^t F\right)^{-1}$
- Let $S \subseteq X$ and let $S^{\circ}$ denotes the absolute polar of $A,$ then:
  1. $[F(S)]^{\circ} = \left({}^t F\right)^{-1}\left(S^{\circ}\right)$;
  2. if $F(S) \subseteq T$ for some $T \subseteq W,$ then ${}^t F\left(T^{\circ}\right) \subseteq S^{\circ}$;
  3. if $T \subseteq W$ is such that ${}^t F\left(T^{\circ}\right) \subseteq S^{\circ},$ then $F(S) \subseteq T^{\circ\circ}$;
  4. if $T \subseteq W$ and $S \subseteq X$ are weakly closed disks then ${}^t F\left(T^{\circ}\right) \subseteq S^{\circ}$ if and only if $F(S) \subseteq T$;
  5. $\operatorname{ker} {}^t F = [ F(X) ]^{\perp}.$

These results hold when the real polar is used in place of the absolute polar.

If $X$ and $Y$ are normed spaces under their canonical dualities and if $F : X \to Y$ is a continuous linear map, then $\|F\| = \left\|{}^t F\right\|.$

==== Weak continuity ====
A linear map $F : X \to W$ is weakly continuous (with respect to $(X, Y, b)$ and $(W, Z, c)$) if $F : (X, \sigma(X, Y, b)) \to (W, (W, Z, c))$ is continuous.

The following result shows that the existence of the transpose map is intimately tied to the weak topology.

Proposition—Assume that $X$ distinguishes points of $Y$ and $F : X \to W$ is a linear map. Then the following are equivalent:

1. $F$ is weakly continuous (that is, $F : (X, \sigma(X, Y, b)) \to (W, (W, Z, c))$ is continuous);
2. $c(F(\,\cdot\,), Z) \subseteq b(\,\cdot\,, Y)$;
3. the transpose of $F$ is well-defined.

If $F$ is weakly continuous then

- ${}^t F : Z \to Y$ is weakly continuous, meaning that ${}^t F : (Z, \sigma(Z, W, c)) \to (Y, (Y, X, b))$ is continuous;
- the transpose of ${}^t F$ is well-defined if and only if $Z$ distinguishes points of $W,$ in which case ${}^{tt} F = F.$

=== Weak topology and the canonical duality ===
Suppose that $X$ is a vector space and that $X^{\#}$ is its the algebraic dual. Then every $\sigma\left(X, X^{\#}\right)$-bounded subset of $X$ is contained in a finite dimensional vector subspace and every vector subspace of $X$ is $\sigma\left(X, X^{\#}\right)$-closed.

==== Weak completeness ====
If $(X, \sigma(X, Y, b))$ is a complete topological vector space say that $X$ is $\sigma(X, Y, b)$-complete or (if no ambiguity can arise) weakly-complete. There exist Banach spaces that are not weakly-complete (despite being complete in their norm topology).

If $X$ is a vector space then under the canonical duality, $\left(X^{\#}, \sigma\left(X^{\#}, X\right)\right)$ is complete. Conversely, if $Z$ is a Hausdorff locally convex TVS with continuous dual space $Z^{\prime},$ then $\left(Z, \sigma\left(Z, Z^{\prime}\right)\right)$ is complete if and only if $Z = \left(Z^{\prime}\right)^{\#}$; that is, if and only if the map $Z \to \left(Z^{\prime}\right)^{\#}$ defined by sending $z \in Z$ to the evaluation map at $z$ (i.e. $z^{\prime} \mapsto z^{\prime}(z)$) is a bijection.

In particular, with respect to the canonical duality, if $Y$ is a vector subspace of $X^{\#}$ such that $Y$ separates points of $X,$ then $(Y, \sigma(Y, X))$ is complete if and only if $Y = X^{\#}.$ Said differently, there does not exist a proper vector subspace $Y \neq X^{\#}$ of $X^{\#}$ such that $(X, \sigma(X, Y))$ is Hausdorff and $Y$ is complete in the weak-* topology (i.e. the topology of pointwise convergence). Consequently, when the continuous dual space $X^{\prime}$ of a Hausdorff locally convex TVS $X$ is endowed with the weak-* topology, then $X^{\prime}_{\sigma}$ is complete if and only if $X^{\prime} = X^{\#}$ (that is, if and only if every linear functional on $X$ is continuous).

==== Identification of Y with a subspace of the algebraic dual ====
If $X$ distinguishes points of $Y$ and if $Z$ denotes the range of the injection $y \mapsto b(\,\cdot\,, y)$ then $Z$ is a vector subspace of the algebraic dual space of $X$ and the pairing $(X, Y, b)$ becomes canonically identified with the canonical pairing $\langle X, Z \rangle$ (where $\left\langle x, x^{\prime} \right\rangle := x^{\prime}(x)$ is the natural evaluation map). In particular, in this situation it will be assumed without loss of generality that $Y$ is a vector subspace of $X$'s algebraic dual and $b$ is the evaluation map.

Convention: Often, whenever $y \mapsto b(\,\cdot\,, y)$ is injective (especially when $(X, Y, b)$ forms a dual pair) then it is common practice to assume without loss of generality that $Y$ is a vector subspace of the algebraic dual space of $X,$ that $b$ is the natural evaluation map, and also denote $Y$ by $X^{\prime}.$

In a completely analogous manner, if $Y$ distinguishes points of $X$ then it is possible for $X$ to be identified as a vector subspace of $Y$'s algebraic dual space.

==== Algebraic adjoint ====
In the special case where the dualities are the canonical dualities $\left\langle X, X^{\#} \right\rangle$ and $\left\langle W, W^{\#} \right\rangle,$ the transpose of a linear map $F : X \to W$ is always well-defined. This transpose is called the algebraic adjoint of $F$ and it will be denoted by $F^{\#}$; that is, $F^{\#} = {}^t F : W^{\#} \to X^{\#}.$ In this case, for all $w^{\prime} \in W^{\#},$ $F^{\#}\left(w^{\prime}\right) = w^{\prime} \circ F$ where the defining condition for $F^{\#}\left(w^{\prime}\right)$ is:
$$\left\langle x, F^{\#}\left(w^{\prime}\right) \right\rangle = \left\langle F(x), w^{\prime} \right\rangle \quad \text{ for all } >x \in X,$$
or equivalently, $F^{\#}\left(w^{\prime}\right)(x) = w^{\prime}(F(x)) \quad \text{ for all } x \in X.$

If $X = Y = \mathbb{K}^n$ for some integer $n,$ $\mathcal{E} = \left\{ e_1, \ldots, e_n\right\}$ is a basis for $X$ with dual basis $\mathcal{E}^{\prime} = \left\{ e_1^{\prime}, \ldots, e_n^{\prime} \right\},$ $F : \mathbb{K}^n \to \mathbb{K}^n$ is a linear operator, and the matrix representation of $F$ with respect to $\mathcal{E}$ is $M := \left(f_{i,j}\right),$ then the transpose of $M$ is the matrix representation with respect to $\mathcal{E}^{\prime}$ of $F^{\#}.$

==== Weak continuity and openness ====
Suppose that $\left\langle X, Y \right\rangle$ and $\langle W, Z \rangle$ are canonical pairings (so $Y \subseteq X^{\#}$ and $Z \subseteq W^{\#}$) that are dual systems and let $F : X \to W$ be a linear map. Then $F : X \to W$ is weakly continuous if and only if it satisfies any of the following equivalent conditions:

1. $F : (X, \sigma(X, Y)) \to (W, \sigma(W, Z))$ is continuous.
2. $F^{\#}(Z) \subseteq Y$
3. the transpose of F, ${}^t F : Z \to Y,$ with respect to $\left\langle X, Y \right\rangle$ and $\langle W, Z \rangle$ is well-defined.

If $F$ is weakly continuous then ${}^t F : : (Z, \sigma(Z, W)) \to (Y, \sigma(Y, X))$ will be continuous and furthermore, ${}^{tt} F = F$

A map $g : A \to B$ between topological spaces is relatively open if $g : A \to \operatorname{Im} g$ is an open mapping, where $\operatorname{Im} g$ is the range of $g.$

Suppose that $\langle X, Y \rangle$ and $\langle W, Z \rangle$ are dual systems and $F : X \to W$ is a weakly continuous linear map. Then the following are equivalent:

1. $F : (X, \sigma(X, Y)) \to (W, \sigma(W, Z))$ is relatively open.
2. The range of ${}^t F$ is $\sigma(Y, X)$-closed in $Y$;
3. $\operatorname{Im} {}^t F = (\operatorname{ker} F)^{\perp}$

Furthermore,

- $F : X \to W$ is injective (resp. bijective) if and only if ${}^t F$ is surjective (resp. bijective);
- $F : X \to W$ is surjective if and only if ${}^t F : : (Z, \sigma(Z, W)) \to (Y, \sigma(Y, X))$ is relatively open and injective.

===== Transpose of a map between TVSs =====
The transpose of map between two TVSs is defined if and only if $F$ is weakly continuous.

If $F : X \to Y$ is a linear map between two Hausdorff locally convex topological vector spaces, then:

- If $F$ is continuous then it is weakly continuous and ${}^t F$ is both Mackey continuous and strongly continuous.
- If $F$ is weakly continuous then it is both Mackey continuous and strongly continuous (defined below).
- If $F$ is weakly continuous then it is continuous if and only if ${}^t F : ^{\prime} \to X^{\prime}$ maps equicontinuous subsets of $Y^{\prime}$ to equicontinuous subsets of $X^{\prime}.$
- If $X$ and $Y$ are normed spaces then $F$ is continuous if and only if it is weakly continuous, in which case $\|F\| = \left\|{}^t F\right\|.$
- If $F$ is continuous then $F : X \to Y$ is relatively open if and only if $F$ is weakly relatively open (i.e. $F : \left(X, \sigma\left(X, X^{\prime}\right)\right) \to \left(Y, \sigma\left(Y, Y^{\prime}\right)\right)$ is relatively open) and every equicontinuous subsets of $\operatorname{Im} {}^t F = {}^t F\left(Y^{\prime}\right)$ is the image of some equicontinuous subsets of $Y^{\prime}.$
- If $F$ is continuous injection then $F : X \to Y$ is a TVS-embedding (or equivalently, a topological embedding) if and only if every equicontinuous subsets of $X^{\prime}$ is the image of some equicontinuous subsets of $Y^{\prime}.$

==== Metrizability and separability ====
Let $X$ be a locally convex space with continuous dual space $X^{\prime}$ and let $K \subseteq X^{\prime}.$

1. If $K$ is equicontinuous or $\sigma\left(X^{\prime}, X\right)$-compact, and if $D \subseteq X^{\prime}$ is such that $\operatorname{span} D$ is dense in $X,$ then the subspace topology that $K$ inherits from $\left(X^{\prime}, \sigma\left(X^{\prime}, D\right)\right)$ is identical to the subspace topology that $K$ inherits from $\left(X^{\prime}, \sigma\left(X^{\prime}, X\right)\right).$
2. If $X$ is separable and $K$ is equicontinuous then $K,$ when endowed with the subspace topology induced by $\left(X^{\prime}, \sigma\left(X^{\prime}, X\right)\right),$ is metrizable.
3. If $X$ is separable and metrizable, then $\left(X^{\prime}, \sigma\left(X^{\prime}, X\right)\right)$ is separable.
4. If $X$ is a normed space then $X$ is separable if and only if the closed unit call the continuous dual space of $X$ is metrizable when given the subspace topology induced by $\left(X^{\prime}, \sigma\left(X^{\prime}, X\right)\right).$
5. If $X$ is a normed space whose continuous dual space is separable (when given the usual norm topology), then $X$ is separable.

== Polar topologies and topologies compatible with pairing ==
Starting with only the weak topology, the use of polar sets produces a range of locally convex topologies. Such topologies are called polar topologies. The weak topology is the weakest topology of this range.

Throughout, $(X, Y, b)$ will be a pairing over $\mathbb{K}$ and $\mathcal{G}$ will be a non-empty collection of $\sigma(X, Y, b)$-bounded subsets of $X.$

=== Polar topologies ===
Given a collection $\mathcal{G}$ of subsets of $X$, the polar topology on $Y$ determined by $\mathcal{G}$ (and $b$) or the $\mathcal{G}$-topology on $Y$ is the unique topological vector space (TVS) topology on $Y$ for which
$$\left\{ r G^{\circ} : G \in \mathcal{G}, r > 0 \right\}$$
forms a subbasis of neighborhoods at the origin. When $Y$ is endowed with this $\mathcal{G}$-topology then it is denoted by Y_{$\mathcal{G}$}. Every polar topology is necessarily locally convex. When $\mathcal{G}$ is a directed set with respect to subset inclusion (i.e. if for all $G, K \in \mathcal{G}$ there exists some $K \in \mathcal{G}$ such that $G \cup H \subseteq K$) then this neighborhood subbasis at 0 actually forms a neighborhood basis at 0.

The following table lists some of the more important polar topologies.

Notation: If $\Delta(X, Y, b)$ denotes a polar topology on $Y$ then $Y$ endowed with this topology will be denoted by $Y_{\Delta(Y, X, b)},$ $Y_{\Delta(Y, X)}$ or simply $Y_{\Delta}$ (e.g. for $\sigma(Y, X, b)$ we'd have $\Delta = \sigma$ so that $Y_{\sigma(Y, X, b)},$ $Y_{\sigma(Y, X)}$ and $Y_{\sigma}$ all denote $Y$ endowed with $\sigma(X, Y, b)$).

$\mathcal{G} \subseteq \mathcal{P}X$ ("topology of uniform convergence on ...")	Notation	Name ("topology of...")	Alternative name
finite subsets of $X$ (or $\sigma(X, Y, b)$-closed disked hulls of finite subsets of $X$)	$\sigma(X, Y, b)$ $s(X, Y, b)$	pointwise/simple convergence	weak/weak* topology
$\sigma(X, Y, b)$-compact disks	$\tau(X, Y, b)$		Mackey topology
$\sigma(X, Y, b)$-compact convex subsets	$\gamma(X, Y, b)$	compact convex convergence	
$\sigma(X, Y, b)$-compact subsets (or balanced $\sigma(X, Y, b)$-compact subsets)	$c(X, Y, b)$	compact convergence	
$\sigma(X, Y, b)$-bounded subsets	$b(X, Y, b)$ $\beta(X, Y, b)$	bounded convergence	strong topology Strongest polar topology

==== Definitions involving polar topologies ====
Continuity

A linear map $F : X \to W$ is Mackey continuous (with respect to $(X, Y, b)$ and $(W, Z, c)$) if $F : (X, \tau(X, Y, b)) \to (W, \tau(W, Z, c))$ is continuous.

A linear map $F : X \to W$ is strongly continuous (with respect to $(X, Y, b)$ and $(W, Z, c)$) if $F : (X, \beta(X, Y, b)) \to (W, \beta(W, Z, c))$ is continuous.

=== Bounded subsets ===
A subset of $X$ is weakly bounded (resp. Mackey bounded, strongly bounded) if it is bounded in $(X, \sigma(X, Y, b))$ (resp. bounded in $(X, \tau(X, Y, b)),$ bounded in $(X, \beta(X, Y, b))$).

=== Topologies compatible with a pair ===
If $(X, Y, b)$ is a pairing over $\mathbb{K}$ and $\mathcal{T}$ is a vector topology on $X$ then $\mathcal{T}$ is a topology of the pairing and that it is compatible (or consistent) with the pairing $(X, Y, b)$ if it is locally convex and if the continuous dual space of $\left(X, \mathcal{T}\right) = b(\,\cdot\,, Y).$ (Note: Of course, there is an analogous definition for topologies on $Y$ to be "compatible it a pairing" but this article will only deal with topologies on $X.$) If $X$ distinguishes points of $Y$ then by identifying $Y$ as a vector subspace of $X$'s algebraic dual, the defining condition becomes: $\left(X, \mathcal{T}\right)^{\prime} = Y.$ Some authors (e.g. [Trèves 2006] and [Schaefer 1999]) require that a topology of a pair also be Hausdorff, which it would have to be if $Y$ distinguishes the points of $X$ (which these authors assume).

The weak topology $\sigma(X, Y, b)$ is compatible with the pairing $(X, Y, b)$ (as was shown in the Weak representation theorem) and it is in fact the weakest such topology. There is a strongest topology compatible with this pairing and that is the Mackey topology. If $N$ is a normed space that is not reflexive then the usual norm topology on its continuous dual space is not compatible with the duality $\left(N^{\prime}, N\right).$

==== Mackey–Arens theorem ====
The following is one of the most important theorems in duality theory.

Mackey–Arens theorem I—Let $(X, Y, b)$ will be a pairing such that $X$ distinguishes the points of $Y$ and let $\mathcal{T}$ be a locally convex topology on $X$ (not necessarily Hausdorff). Then $\mathcal{T}$ is compatible with the pairing $(X, Y, b)$ if and only if $\mathcal{T}$ is a polar topology determined by some collection $\mathcal{G}$ of $\sigma(Y, X, b)$-compact disks that cover (Note: Recall that a collection of subsets of a set $S$ is said to cover $S$ if every point of $S$ is contained in some set belonging to the collection.) $Y.$

It follows that the Mackey topology $\tau(X, Y, b),$ which recall is the polar topology generated by all $\sigma(X, Y, b)$-compact disks in $Y,$ is the strongest locally convex topology on $X$ that is compatible with the pairing $(X, Y, b).$ A locally convex space whose given topology is identical to the Mackey topology is called a Mackey space. The following consequence of the above Mackey-Arens theorem is also called the Mackey-Arens theorem.

Mackey–Arens theorem II—Let $(X, Y, b)$ will be a pairing such that $X$ distinguishes the points of $Y$ and let $\mathcal{T}$ be a locally convex topology on $X.$ Then $\mathcal{T}$ is compatible with the pairing if and only if $\sigma(X, Y, b) \subseteq \mathcal{T} \subseteq \tau(X, Y, b).$

=== Mackey's theorem, barrels, and closed convex sets ===
If $X$ is a TVS (over $\Reals$ or $\Complex$) then a half-space is a set of the form $\{ x \in X : f(x) \leq r \}$ for some real $r$ and some continuous real linear functional $f$ on $X.$

Theorem—If $X$ is a locally convex space (over $\Reals$ or $\Complex$) and if $C$ is a non-empty closed and convex subset of $X,$ then $C$ is equal to the intersection of all closed half spaces containing it.

The above theorem implies that the closed and convex subsets of a locally convex space depend entirely on the continuous dual space. Consequently, the closed and convex subsets are the same in any topology compatible with duality;that is, if $\mathcal{T}$ and $\mathcal{L}$ are any locally convex topologies on $X$ with the same continuous dual spaces, then a convex subset of $X$ is closed in the $\mathcal{T}$ topology if and only if it is closed in the $\mathcal{L}$ topology. This implies that the $\mathcal{T}$-closure of any convex subset of $X$ is equal to its $\mathcal{L}$-closure and that for any $\mathcal{T}$-closed disk $A$ in $X,$ $A = A^{\circ\circ}.$ In particular, if $B$ is a subset of $X$ then $B$ is a barrel in $(X, \mathcal{L})$ if and only if it is a barrel in $(X, \mathcal{L}).$

The following theorem shows that barrels (i.e. closed absorbing disks) are exactly the polars of weakly bounded subsets.

Theorem—Let $(X, Y, b)$ will be a pairing such that $X$ distinguishes the points of $Y$ and let $\mathcal{T}$ be a topology of the pair. Then a subset of $X$ is a barrel in $X$ if and only if it is equal to the polar of some $\sigma(Y, X, b)$-bounded subset of $Y.$

If $X$ is a topological vector space, then:

1. A closed absorbing and balanced subset $B$ of $X$ absorbs each convex compact subset of $X$ (i.e. there exists a real $r > 0$ such that $r B$ contains that set).
2. If $X$ is Hausdorff and locally convex then every barrel in $X$ absorbs every convex bounded complete subset of $X.$

All of this leads to Mackey's theorem, which is one of the central theorems in the theory of dual systems. In short, it states the bounded subsets are the same for any two Hausdorff locally convex topologies that are compatible with the same duality.

Mackey's theorem—Suppose that $(X, \mathcal{L})$ is a Hausdorff locally convex space with continuous dual space $X^{\prime}$ and consider the canonical duality $\left\langle X, X^{\prime} \right\rangle.$ If $\mathcal{L}$ is any topology on $X$ that is compatible with the duality $\left\langle X, X^{\prime} \right\rangle$ on $X$ then the bounded subsets of $(X, \mathcal{L})$ are the same as the bounded subsets of $(X, \mathcal{L}).$

=== Space of finite sequences ===
Let $X$ denote the space of all sequences of scalars $r_{\bull} = \left(r_i\right)_{i=1}^{\infty}$ such that $r_i = 0$ for all sufficiently large $i.$ Let $Y = X$ and define a bilinear map $b : X \times X \to \mathbb{K}$ by
$$b\left(r_{\bull}, s_{\bull}\right) := \sum_{i=1}^{\infty} r_i s_i.$$
Then $\sigma(X, X, b) = \tau(X, X, b).$ Moreover, a subset $T \subseteq X$ is $\sigma(X, X, b)$-bounded (resp. $\beta(X, X, b)$-bounded) if and only if there exists a sequence $m_{\bull} = \left(m_i\right)_{i=1}^{\infty}$ of positive real numbers such that $\left|t_i\right| \leq m_i$ for all $t_{\bull} = \left(t_i\right)_{i=1}^{\infty} \in T$ and all indices $i$ (resp. and $m_{\bull} \in X$).

It follows that there are weakly bounded (that is, $\sigma(X, X, b)$-bounded) subsets of $X$ that are not strongly bounded (that is, not $\beta(X, X, b)$-bounded).

== See also ==
- Beta-dual space
- Biorthogonal system – Pair of vector spaces
- Dual space – In mathematics, vector space of linear forms
- Dual topology
- Duality (mathematics) – General concept and operation in mathematics
- Inner product – Vector space with generalized dot product
- L-semi-inner product – Generalization of inner products that applies to all normed spaces
- Pairing – Bilinear map in mathematics
- Polar set – Subset of all points that is bounded by some given point of a dual (in a dual pairing)
- Polar topology – Dual space topology of uniform convergence on some sub-collection of bounded subsets
- Reductive dual pair
- Strong dual space – Continuous dual space endowed with the topology of uniform convergence on bounded sets
- Strong topology (polar topology) – Continuous dual space endowed with the topology of uniform convergence on bounded sets
- Topologies on spaces of linear maps
- Weak topology – Mathematical term

== Bibliography ==
- Narici, Lawrence; Beckenstein, Edward (2011). Topological Vector Spaces. Pure and applied mathematics (Second ed.). Boca Raton, FL: CRC Press. ISBN 978-1584888666. OCLC 144216834.
- Michael Reed and Barry Simon, Methods of Modern Mathematical Physics, Vol. 1, Functional Analysis, Section III.3. Academic Press, San Diego, 1980. ISBN 0-12-585050-6.
- Rudin, Walter (1991). Functional Analysis. International Series in Pure and Applied Mathematics. Vol. 8 (Second ed.). New York, NY: McGraw-Hill Science/Engineering/Math. ISBN 978-0-07-054236-5. OCLC 21163277.
- Schaefer, Helmut H.; Wolff, Manfred P. (1999). Topological Vector Spaces. GTM. Vol. 8 (Second ed.). New York, NY: Springer New York Imprint Springer. ISBN 978-1-4612-7155-0. OCLC 840278135.
- Schmitt, Lothar M (1992). "An Equivariant Version of the Hahn–Banach Theorem". Houston J. Of Math. 18: 429–447.
- Trèves, François (2006) [1967]. Topological Vector Spaces, Distributions and Kernels. Mineola, N.Y.: Dover Publications. ISBN 978-0-486-45352-1. OCLC 853623322.
