= Strong topology =

In mathematics, a strong topology is a topology which is stronger than some other "default" topology. This term is used to describe different topologies depending on context, and it may refer to:

- the final topology on the disjoint union
- the topology arising from a norm
- the strong operator topology
- the strong topology (polar topology), which subsumes all topologies above.

A topology τ is stronger than a topology σ (is a finer topology) if τ contains all the open sets of σ.

In algebraic geometry, it usually means the topology of an algebraic variety as complex manifold or subspace of complex projective space, as opposed to the Zariski topology (which is rarely even a Hausdorff space).

== See also ==
- Weak topology
