= Weak topology =

Mathematical concept

In mathematics, weak topology is an alternative term for certain initial topologies, often on topological vector spaces or spaces of linear operators, for instance on a Hilbert space. The term is most commonly used for the initial topology of a topological vector space (such as a normed vector space) with respect to its continuous dual. The remainder of this article will deal with this case, which is one of the concepts of functional analysis.

One may call subsets of a topological vector space weakly closed (respectively, weakly compact, etc.) if they are closed (respectively, compact, etc.) with respect to the weak topology. Likewise, functions are sometimes called weakly continuous (respectively, weakly differentiable, weakly analytic, etc.) if they are continuous (respectively, differentiable, analytic, etc.) with respect to the weak topology.

== History ==
Starting in the early 1900s, David Hilbert and Marcel Riesz made extensive use of weak convergence. The early pioneers of functional analysis did not elevate norm convergence above weak convergence and oftentimes viewed weak convergence as preferable. In 1929, Banach introduced weak convergence for normed spaces and also introduced the analogous weak-* convergence. The weak topology is called topologie faible in French and schwache Topologie in German.

== The weak and strong topologies ==
Let $\mathbb{K}$ be a topological field, namely a field with a topology such that addition, multiplication, and division are continuous. In most applications $\mathbb{K}$ will be either the field of complex numbers or the field of real numbers with the familiar topologies.

=== Weak topology with respect to a pairing ===
Both the weak topology and the weak* topology are special cases of a more general construction for pairings, which we now describe. The benefit of this more general construction is that any definition or result proved for it applies to both the weak topology and the weak* topology, thereby making redundant the need for many definitions, theorem statements, and proofs. This is also the reason why the weak* topology is also frequently referred to as the "weak topology"; because it is just an instance of the weak topology in the setting of this more general construction.

Suppose (X, Y, b) is a pairing of vector spaces over a topological field $\mathbb{K}$ (i.e. X and Y are vector spaces over $\mathbb{K}$ and b : X × Y → $\mathbb{K}$ is a bilinear map).

Notation. For all x ∈ X, let b(x, •) : Y → $\mathbb{K}$ denote the linear functional on Y defined by y ↦ b(x, y). Similarly, for all y ∈ Y, let b(•, y) : X → $\mathbb{K}$ be defined by x ↦ b(x, y).

Definition. The weak topology on X induced by Y (and b) is the weakest topology on X, denoted by 𝜎(X, Y, b) or simply 𝜎(X, Y), making all maps b(•, y) : X → $\mathbb{K}$ continuous, as y ranges over Y.

The weak topology on Y is now automatically defined as described in the article Dual system. However, for clarity, we now repeat it.

Definition. The weak topology on Y induced by X (and b) is the weakest topology on Y, denoted by 𝜎(Y, X, b) or simply 𝜎(Y, X), making all maps b(x, •) : Y → $\mathbb{K}$ continuous, as x ranges over X.

If the field $\mathbb{K}$ has an absolute value |⋅|, then the weak topology 𝜎(X, Y, b) on X is induced by the family of seminorms, p_{y} : X → $\mathbb{R}$, defined by

p_{y}(x) := |b(x, y)|

for all y ∈ Y and x ∈ X. This shows that weak topologies are locally convex.

Assumption. We will henceforth assume that $\mathbb{K}$ is either the real numbers $\mathbb{R}$ or the complex numbers $\mathbb{C}$.

==== Canonical duality ====
We now consider the special case where Y is a vector subspace of the algebraic dual space of X (i.e. a vector space of linear functionals on X).

There is a pairing, denoted by $(X,Y,\langle\cdot, \cdot\rangle)$ or $(X,Y)$, called the canonical pairing whose bilinear map $\langle\cdot, \cdot\rangle$ is the canonical evaluation map, defined by $\langle x,x'\rangle =x'(x)$ for all $x\in X$ and $x'\in Y$. Note in particular that $\langle \cdot,x'\rangle$ is just another way of denoting $x'$ i.e. $\langle \cdot,x'\rangle=x'(\cdot)$.

Assumption. If Y is a vector subspace of the algebraic dual space of X then we will assume that they are associated with the canonical pairing ⟨X, Y⟩.

In this case, the weak topology on X (resp. the weak topology on Y), denoted by 𝜎(X,Y) (resp. by 𝜎(Y,X)), is the weak topology on X (resp. on Y) with respect to the canonical pairing ⟨X, Y⟩.

The topology σ(X,Y) is the initial topology of X with respect to Y.

If Y is a vector space of linear functionals on X, then the continuous dual of X with respect to the topology σ(X,Y) is precisely equal to Y.(Rudin 1991, Theorem 3.10)

==== The weak and weak* topologies ====
Let X be a topological vector space (TVS) over $\mathbb{K}$, that is, X is a $\mathbb{K}$ vector space equipped with a topology so that vector addition and scalar multiplication are continuous. We call the topology that X starts with the original, starting, or given topology (the reader is cautioned against using the terms "initial topology" and "strong topology" to refer to the original topology since these already have well-known meanings, so using them may cause confusion). We may define a possibly different topology on X using the topological or continuous dual space $X^*$, which consists of all linear functionals from X into the base field $\mathbb{K}$ that are continuous with respect to the given topology.

Recall that $\langle\cdot,\cdot\rangle$ is the canonical evaluation map defined by $\langle x,x'\rangle =x'(x)$ for all $x\in X$ and $x'\in X^*$, where in particular, $\langle \cdot,x'\rangle=x'(\cdot)= x'$.

Definition. The weak topology on X is the weak topology on X with respect to the canonical pairing $\langle X,X^*\rangle$.

Definition: The weak topology on $X^*$ is the weak topology on $X^*$ with respect to the canonical pairing $\langle X,X^*\rangle$. This topology is also called the weak* topology.

=== Weak topology induced by the continuous dual space ===
Alternatively, the weak topology on a TVS X is the initial topology with respect to the family $X^*$. In other words, it is the coarsest topology on X such that each element of $X^*$ remains a continuous function.

A subbase for the weak topology is the collection of sets of the form $\phi^{-1}(U)$ where $\phi\in X^*$ and U is an open subset of the base field $\mathbb{K}$. In other words, a subset of X is open in the weak topology if and only if it can be written as the union of (possibly infinitely many) sets, each of which is the intersection of finitely many sets of the form $\phi^{-1}(U)$.

From this point of view, the weak topology is the coarsest polar topology.

=== Weak convergence ===
The weak topology is characterized by the following condition: a net $(x_\lambda)$ in X converges in the weak topology to the element x of X if and only if $\phi(x_\lambda)$ converges to $\phi(x)$ in $\mathbb{R}$ or $\mathbb{C}$ for all $\phi\in X^*$.

In particular, if $x_n$ is a sequence in X, then $x_n$ converges weakly to x if

$$\varphi(x_n) \to \varphi(x)$$

as n → ∞ for all $\varphi \in X^*$. In this case, it is customary to write

$$x_n \overset{\mathrm{w}}{\longrightarrow} x$$

or, sometimes,

$$x_n \rightharpoonup x.$$

=== Other properties ===
If X is equipped with the weak topology, then addition and scalar multiplication remain continuous operations, and X is a locally convex topological vector space.

If X is a normed space, then the dual space $X^*$ is itself a normed vector space by using the norm

$$\|\phi\|=\sup_{\|x\|\le 1} |\phi(x)|.$$

This norm gives rise to a topology, called the strong topology, on $X^*$. This is the topology of uniform convergence. The uniform and strong topologies are generally different for other spaces of linear maps; see below.

== Weak-* topology ==
Weak-* convergence

A net $\phi_{\lambda}$ in $X^*$ is convergent to $\phi$ in the weak-* topology if it converges pointwise:

$$\phi_{\lambda} (x) \to \phi (x)$$

for all $x\in X$. In particular, a sequence of $\phi_n\in X^*$ converges to $\phi$ provided that

$$\phi_n(x)\to\phi(x)$$

for all x ∈ X. In this case, one writes

$$\phi_n \overset{w^*}{\to} \phi$$

as n → ∞.

Weak-* convergence is sometimes called the simple convergence or the pointwise convergence. Indeed, it coincides with the pointwise convergence of linear functionals.

=== Properties ===
If X is a separable (i.e. has a countable dense subset) locally convex space and H is a norm-bounded subset of its continuous dual space, then H endowed with the weak* (subspace) topology is a metrizable topological space. However, for infinite-dimensional spaces, the metric cannot be translation-invariant. If X is a separable metrizable locally convex space then the weak* topology on the continuous dual space of X is separable.

Properties on normed spaces

By definition, the weak* topology is weaker than the weak topology on $X^*$. An important fact about the weak* topology is the Banach–Alaoglu theorem: if X is normed, then the closed unit ball in $X^*$ is weak*-compact (more generally, the polar in $X^*$ of a neighborhood of 0 in X is weak*-compact). Moreover, the closed unit ball in a normed space X is compact in the weak topology if and only if X is reflexive.

In more generality, let F be locally compact valued field (e.g., the reals, the complex numbers, or any of the p-adic number systems). Let X be a normed topological vector space over F, compatible with the absolute value in F. Then in $X^*$, the topological dual space X of continuous F-valued linear functionals on X, all norm-closed balls are compact in the weak* topology.

If X is a normed space, a version of the Heine-Borel theorem holds. In particular, a subset of the continuous dual is weak* compact if and only if it is weak* closed and norm-bounded. This implies, in particular, that when X is an infinite-dimensional normed space then the closed unit ball at the origin in the dual space of X does not contain any weak* neighborhood of 0 (since any such neighborhood is norm-unbounded). Thus, even though norm-closed balls are compact, X* is not weak* locally compact.

If X is a normed space, then X is separable if and only if the weak* topology on the closed unit ball of $X^*$ is metrizable, in which case the weak* topology is metrizable on norm-bounded subsets of $X^*$. If a normed space X has a dual space that is separable (with respect to the dual-norm topology) then X is necessarily separable. If X is a Banach space, the weak* topology is not metrizable on all of $X^*$ unless X is finite-dimensional.

== Examples ==
=== Hilbert spaces ===
Consider, for example, the difference between strong and weak convergence of functions in the Hilbert space L^{2}($\mathbb{R}^n$). Strong convergence of a sequence $\psi_k\in L^2(\R^n)$ to an element ψ means that

$$\int_{\R^n} |\psi_k-\psi |^2\,{\rm d}\mu\, \to 0$$

as k → ∞. Here the notion of convergence corresponds to the norm on L^{2}.

In contrast weak convergence only demands that

$$\int_{\R^n} \bar{\psi}_k f\,\mathrm d\mu \to \int_{\R^n} \bar{\psi}f\, \mathrm d\mu$$

for all functions f ∈ L^{2} (or equivalently, all f in a dense subset of L^{2} such as a space of test functions, if the sequence {ψ_{k}} is bounded). For given test functions, the relevant notion of convergence only corresponds to the topology used in $\mathbb{C}$.

For example, in the Hilbert space L^{2}(0,π), the sequence of functions

$$\psi_k(x) = \sqrt{2/\pi}\sin(k x)$$

forms an orthonormal basis. In particular, the (strong) limit of $\psi_k$ as k → ∞ does not exist. On the other hand, being an orthonormal sequence in a Hilbert space, it must converge weakly to zero, by the Riesz representation theorem, Bessel's inequality, and the nth-term test for series. Alternatively, the Riemann–Lebesgue lemma can be used to show that the weak limit exists and is zero.

=== Distributions ===
One normally obtains spaces of distributions by forming the strong dual of a space of test functions (such as the compactly supported smooth functions on $\mathbb{R}^n$). In an alternative construction of such spaces, one can take the weak dual of a space of test functions inside a Hilbert space such as L^{2}. Thus one is led to consider the idea of a rigged Hilbert space.

=== Weak topology induced by the algebraic dual ===
Suppose that X is a vector space and X^{#} is the algebraic dual space of X (i.e. the vector space of all linear functionals on X). If X is endowed with the weak topology induced by X^{#} then the continuous dual space of X is X^{#}, every bounded subset of X is contained in a finite-dimensional vector subspace of X, every vector subspace of X is closed and has a topological complement.

== Operator topologies ==
If X and Y are topological vector spaces, the space L(X,Y) of continuous linear operators f : X → Y may carry a variety of different possible topologies. The naming of such topologies depends on the kind of topology one is using on the target space Y to define operator convergence (Yosida 1980, IV.7 Topologies of linear maps). There are, in general, a vast array of possible operator topologies on L(X,Y), whose naming is not entirely intuitive.

For example, the strong operator topology on L(X,Y) is the topology of pointwise convergence. For instance, if Y is a normed space, then this topology is defined by the seminorms indexed by x ∈ X:

$$f\mapsto \|f(x)\|_Y.$$

More generally, if a family of seminorms Q defines the topology on Y, then the seminorms p_{q, x} on L(X,Y) defining the strong topology are given by

$$p_{q,x} : f \mapsto q(f(x)),$$

indexed by q ∈ Q and x ∈ X.

In particular, see the weak operator topology and weak* operator topology.

== See also ==
- Eberlein compactum, a compact set in the weak topology
- Weak convergence (Hilbert space)
- Weak-star operator topology
- Weak convergence of measures
- Topologies on spaces of linear maps
- Topologies on the set of operators on a Hilbert space
- Vague topology

== Bibliography ==
- Conway, John B. (1994), A Course in Functional Analysis (2nd ed.), Springer-Verlag, ISBN 0-387-97245-5
- Folland, G.B. (1999). Real Analysis: Modern Techniques and Their Applications (Second ed.). John Wiley & Sons, Inc. ISBN 978-0-471-31716-6.
- Narici, Lawrence; Beckenstein, Edward (2011). Topological Vector Spaces. Pure and applied mathematics (Second ed.). Boca Raton, FL: CRC Press. ISBN 978-1584888666. OCLC 144216834.
- Pedersen, Gert (1989), Analysis Now, Springer, ISBN 0-387-96788-5
- Rudin, Walter (1991). Functional Analysis. International Series in Pure and Applied Mathematics. Vol. 8 (Second ed.). New York, NY: McGraw-Hill Science/Engineering/Math. ISBN 978-0-07-054236-5. OCLC 21163277.
- Schaefer, Helmut H.; Wolff, Manfred P. (1999). Topological Vector Spaces. GTM. Vol. 8 (Second ed.). New York, NY: Springer New York Imprint Springer. ISBN 978-1-4612-7155-0. OCLC 840278135.
- Trèves, François (2006) [1967]. Topological Vector Spaces, Distributions and Kernels. Mineola, N.Y.: Dover Publications. ISBN 978-0-486-45352-1. OCLC 853623322.
- Willard, Stephen (February 2004). General Topology. Courier Dover Publications. ISBN 9780486434797.
- Yosida, Kosaku (1980), Functional analysis (6th ed.), Springer, ISBN 978-3-540-58654-8
