= Bornology =

Mathematical generalization of boundedness

In mathematics, especially functional analysis, a bornology on a set X is a collection of subsets of X satisfying axioms that generalize the notion of boundedness. One of the key motivations behind bornologies and bornological analysis is the fact that bornological spaces provide a convenient setting for homological algebra in functional analysis. This is because^{pg 9} the category of bornological spaces is additive, complete, cocomplete, and has a tensor product adjoint to an internal hom, all necessary components for homological algebra.

== History ==
Bornology originates from functional analysis. There are two natural ways of studying the problems of functional analysis: one way is to study notions related to topologies (vector topologies, continuous operators, open/compact subsets, etc.) and the other is to study notions related to boundedness (vector bornologies, bounded operators, bounded subsets, etc.).

For normed spaces, from which functional analysis arose, topological and bornological notions are distinct but complementary and closely related. For example, the unit ball centered at the origin is both a neighborhood of the origin and a bounded subset. Furthermore, a subset of a normed space is a neighborhood of the origin (respectively, is a bounded set) exactly when it contains (respectively, it is contained in) a non-zero scalar multiple of this ball; so this is one instance where the topological and bornological notions are distinct but complementary (in the sense that their definitions differ only by which of $\,\subseteq\,$ and $\,\supseteq\,$ is used). Other times, the distinction between topological and bornological notions may even be unnecessary. For example, for linear maps between normed spaces, being continuous (a topological notion) is equivalent to being bounded (a bornological notion). Although the distinction between topology and bornology is often blurred or unnecessary for normed space, it becomes more important when studying generalizations of normed spaces. Nevertheless, bornology and topology can still be thought of as two necessary, distinct, and complementary aspects of one and the same reality.

The general theory of topological vector spaces arose first from the theory of normed spaces and then bornology emerged from this general theory of topological vector spaces, although bornology has since become recognized as a fundamental notion in functional analysis. Born from the work of George Mackey (after whom Mackey spaces are named), the importance of bounded subsets first became apparent in duality theory, especially because of the Mackey–Arens theorem and the Mackey topology. Starting around the 1950s, it became apparent that topological vector spaces were inadequate for the study of certain major problems. For example, the multiplication operation of some important topological algebras was not continuous, although it was often bounded. Other major problems for which TVSs were found to be inadequate was in developing a more general theory of differential calculus, generalizing distributions from (the usual) scalar-valued distributions to vector or operator-valued distributions, and extending the holomorphic functional calculus of Gelfand (which is primarily concerted with Banach algebras or locally convex algebras) to a broader class of operators, including those whose spectra are not compact. Bornology has been found to be a useful tool for investigating these problems and others, including problems in algebraic geometry and general topology.

== Definitions ==
A bornology on a set is a cover of the set that is closed under finite unions and taking subsets. Elements of a bornology are called bounded sets.

Explicitly, a bornology or boundedness on a set $X$ is a family $\mathcal{B} \neq \varnothing$ of subsets of $X$ such that

1. $\mathcal{B}$ is stable under inclusion or downward closed: If $B \in \mathcal{B}$ then every subset of $B$ is an element of $\mathcal{B}.$
  - Stated in plain English, this says that subsets of bounded sets are bounded.
2. $\mathcal{B}$ covers $X:$ Every point of $X$ is an element of some $B \in \mathcal{B},$ or equivalently, $X = {\textstyle\bigcup\limits_{B \in \mathcal{B}} B}.$
  - Assuming (1), this condition may be replaced with: For every $x \in X,$ $\{x\} \in \mathcal{B}.$ In plain English, this says that every point is bounded.
3. $\mathcal{B}$ is stable under finite unions: The union of finitely many elements of $\mathcal{B}$ is an element of $\mathcal{B},$ or equivalently, the union of any two sets belonging to $\mathcal{B}$ also belongs to $\mathcal{B}.$
  - In plain English, this says that the union of two bounded sets is a bounded set.

in which case the pair $(X, \mathcal{B})$ is called a bounded structure or a bornological set.

Thus a bornology can equivalently be defined as a downward closed cover that is closed under binary unions. A non-empty family of sets that closed under finite unions and taking subsets (properties (1) and (3)) is called an ideal (because it is an ideal in the Boolean algebra/field of sets consisting of all subsets). A bornology on a set $X$ can thus be equivalently defined as an ideal that covers $X.$

Elements of $\mathcal{B}$ are called $\mathcal{B}$-bounded sets or simply bounded sets, if $\mathcal{B}$ is understood. Properties (1) and (2) imply that every singleton subset of $X$ is an element of every bornology on $X;$ property (3), in turn, guarantees that the same is true of every finite subset of $X.$ In other words, points and finite subsets are always bounded in every bornology. In particular, the empty set is always bounded.

If $(X, \mathcal{B})$ is a bounded structure and $X \notin \mathcal{B},$ then the set of complements $\{X \setminus B : B \in \mathcal{B}\}$ is a (proper) filter called the filter at infinity; it is always a free filter, which by definition means that it has empty intersection/kernel, because $\{x\} \in \mathcal{B}$ for every $x \in X.$

=== Bases and subbases ===
If $\mathcal{A}$ and $\mathcal{B}$ are bornologies on $X$ then $\mathcal{B}$ is said to be finer or stronger than $\mathcal{A}$ and also $\mathcal{A}$ is said to be coarser or weaker than $\mathcal{B}$ if $\mathcal{A} \subseteq \mathcal{B}.$

A family of sets $\mathcal{A}$ is called a base or fundamental system of a bornology $\mathcal{B}$ if $\mathcal{A} \subseteq \mathcal{B}$ and for every $B \in \mathcal{B},$ there exists an $A \in \mathcal{A}$ such that $B \subseteq A.$

A family of sets $\mathcal{S}$ is called a subbase of a bornology $\mathcal{B}$ if $\mathcal{S} \subseteq \mathcal{B}$ and the collection of all finite unions of sets in $\mathcal{S}$ forms a base for $\mathcal{B}.$

Every base for a bornology is also a subbase for it.

=== Generated bornology ===
The intersection of any collection of (one or more) bornologies on $X$ is once again a bornology on $X.$ Such an intersection of bornologies will cover $X$ because every bornology on $X$ contains every finite subset of $X$ (that is, if $\mathcal{B}$ is a bornology on $X$ and $F \subseteq X$ is finite then $F \in \mathcal{B}$). It is readily verified that such an intersection will also be closed under (subset) inclusion and finite unions and thus will be a bornology on $X.$

Given a collection $\mathcal{S}$ of subsets of $X,$ the smallest bornology on $X$ containing $\mathcal{S}$ is called the bornology generated by $\mathcal{S}$. It is equal to the intersection of all bornologies on $X$ that contain $\mathcal{S}$ as a subset. This intersection is well-defined because the power set $\wp(X)$ of $X$ is always a bornology on $X,$ so every family $\mathcal{S}$ of subsets of $X$ is always contained in at least one bornology on $X.$

== Bounded maps ==
Suppose that $(X, \mathcal{A})$ and $(Y, \mathcal{B})$ are bounded structures. A map $f : X \to Y$ is called a locally bounded map, or just a bounded map, if the image under $f$ of every $\mathcal{A}$-bounded set is a $\mathcal{B}$-bounded set; that is, if for every $A \in \mathcal{A},$ $f(A) \in \mathcal{B}.$

Since the composition of two locally bounded map is again locally bounded, it is clear that the class of all bounded structures forms a category whose morphisms are bounded maps. An isomorphism in this category is called a bornomorphism and it is a bijective locally bounded map whose inverse is also locally bounded.

=== Examples of bounded maps ===
If $f : X \to Y$ is a continuous linear operator between two topological vector spaces (not necessarily Hausdorff), then it is a bounded linear operator when $X$ and $Y$ have their von-Neumann bornologies, where a set is bounded precisely when it is absorbed by all neighbourhoods of origin (these are the subsets of a TVS that are normally called bounded when no other bornology is explicitly mentioned.). The converse is in general false.

A sequentially continuous map $f : X \to Y$ between two TVSs is necessarily locally bounded.

== General constructions ==
Discrete bornology

For any set $X,$ the power set $\wp(X)$ of $X$ is a bornology on $X$ called the discrete bornology. Since every bornology on $X$ is a subset of $\wp(X),$ the discrete bornology is the finest bornology on $X.$ If $(X, \mathcal{B})$ is a bounded structure then (because bornologies are downward closed) $\mathcal{B}$ is the discrete bornology if and only if $X \in \mathcal{B}.$

Indiscrete bornology

For any set $X,$ the set of all finite subsets of $X$ is a bornology on $X$ called the indiscrete bornology. It is the coarsest bornology on $X,$ meaning that it is a subset of every bornology on $X.$

Sets of bounded cardinality

The set of all countable subsets of $X$ is a bornology on $X.$ More generally, for any infinite cardinal $\kappa,$ the set of all subsets of $X$ having cardinality at most $\kappa$ is a bornology on $X.$

=== Inverse image bornology ===
If $f : S \to X$ is a map and $\mathcal{B}$ is a bornology on $X,$ then $\left[f^{-1}(\mathcal{B})\right]$ denotes the bornology generated by $f^{-1}(\mathcal{B}) := \left\{f^{-1}(B) : B \in \mathcal{B}\right\},$ which is called it the inverse image bornology or the initial bornology induced by $f$ on $S.$

Let $S$ be a set, $\left(T_i, \mathcal{B}_i\right)_{i \in I}$ be an $I$-indexed family of bounded structures, and let $\left(f_i\right)_{i \in I}$ be an $I$-indexed family of maps where $f_i : S \to T_i$ for every $i \in I.$ The inverse image bornology $\mathcal{A}$ on $S$ determined by these maps is the strongest bornology on $S$ making each $f_i : (S, \mathcal{A}) \to \left(T_i, \mathcal{B}_i\right)$ locally bounded. This bornology is equal to ${\textstyle \bigcap\limits_{i \in I} \left[f^{-1}\left(\mathcal{B}_i\right)\right]}.$

=== Direct image bornology ===
Let $S$ be a set, $\left(T_i, \mathcal{B}_i\right)_{i \in I}$ be an $I$-indexed family of bounded structures, and let $\left(f_i\right)_{i \in I}$ be an $I$-indexed family of maps where $f_i : T_i \to S$ for every $i \in I.$ The direct image bornology $\mathcal{A}$ on $S$ determined by these maps is the weakest bornology on $S$ making each $f_i : \left(T_i, \mathcal{B}_i\right) \to (S, \mathcal{A})$ locally bounded. If for each $i \in I,$ $\mathcal{A}_i$ denotes the bornology generated by $f\left(\mathcal{B}_i\right),$ then this bornology is equal to the collection of all subsets $A$ of $S$ of the form $\cup_{i \in I} A_i$ where each $A_i \in \mathcal{A}_i$ and all but finitely many $A_i$ are empty.

=== Subspace bornology ===
Suppose that $(X, \mathcal{B})$ is a bounded structure and $S$ be a subset of $X.$ The subspace bornology $\mathcal{A}$ on $S$ is the finest bornology on $S$ making the inclusion map $(S, \mathcal{A}) \to (X, \mathcal{B})$ of $S$ into $X$ (defined by $s \mapsto s$) locally bounded.

=== Product bornology ===
Let $\left(X_i, \mathcal{B}_i\right)_{i \in I}$ be an $I$-indexed family of bounded structures, let $X = {\textstyle \prod\limits_{i \in I} X_i},$ and for each $i \in I,$ let $f_i : X \to X_i$ denote the canonical projection. The product bornology on $X$ is the inverse image bornology determined by the canonical projections $f_i : X \to X_i.$ That is, it is the strongest bornology on $X$ making each of the canonical projections locally bounded. A base for the product bornology is given by ${\textstyle \left\{\prod\limits_{i \in I} B_i ~:~ B_i \in \mathcal{B}_i \text{ for all } i \in I\right\}}.$

== Topological constructions ==
=== Compact bornology ===
A subset of a topological space $X$ is called relatively compact if its closure is a compact subspace of $X.$ For any topological space $X$ in which singleton subsets are relatively compact (such as a T1 space), the set of all relatively compact subsets of $X$ form a bornology on $X$ called the compact bornology on $X.$ Every continuous map between T1 spaces is bounded with respect to their compact bornologies.

The set of relatively compact subsets of $\R$ form a bornology on $\R.$ A base for this bornology is given by all closed intervals of the form $[-n, n]$ for $n = 1, 2, 3, \ldots.$

=== Metric bornology ===
Given a metric space $(X, d),$ the metric bornology consists of all subsets $S \subseteq X$ such that the supremum $\sup_{s, t \in S} d(s, t) < \infty$ is finite.

Similarly, given a measure space $(X, \Omega, \mu),$ the family of all measurable subsets $S \in \Omega$ of finite measure (meaning $\mu(S) < \infty$) form a bornology on $X.$

=== Closure and interior bornologies ===
Suppose that $X$ is a topological space and $\mathcal{B}$ is a bornology on $X.$

The bornology generated by the set of all topological interiors of sets in $\mathcal{B}$ (that is, generated by $\{\operatorname{int} B : B \in \mathcal{B}\}$ is called the interior of $\mathcal{B}$ and is denoted by $\operatorname{int} \mathcal{B}.$ The bornology $\mathcal{B}$ is called open if $\mathcal{B} = \operatorname{int} \mathcal{B}.$

The bornology generated by the set of all topological closures of sets in $\mathcal{B}$ (that is, generated by $\{\operatorname{cl} B : B \in \mathcal{B}\}$) is called the closure of $\mathcal{B}$ and is denoted by $\operatorname{cl} \mathcal{B}.$ We necessarily have $\operatorname{int} \mathcal{B} \subseteq \mathcal{B} \subseteq \operatorname{cl} \mathcal{B}.$

The bornology $\mathcal{B}$ is called closed if it satisfies any of the following equivalent conditions:

1. $\mathcal{B} = \operatorname{cl} \mathcal{B};$
2. the closed subsets of $X$ generate $\mathcal{B}$;
3. the closure of every $B \in \mathcal{B}$ belongs to $\mathcal{B}.$

The bornology $\mathcal{B}$ is called proper if $\mathcal{B}$ is both open and closed.

The topological space $X$ is called locally $\mathcal{B}$-bounded or just locally bounded if every $x \in X$ has a neighborhood that belongs to $\mathcal{B}.$ Every compact subset of a locally bounded topological space is bounded.

=== Bornology of a topological vector space ===
If $X$ is a topological vector space (TVS) then the set of all bounded subsets of $X$ form a bornology (indeed, even a vector bornology) on $X$ called the von Neumann bornology of $X$, the usual bornology, or simply the bornology of $X$ and is referred to as natural boundedness. In any locally convex TVS $X,$ the set of all closed bounded disks forms a base for the usual bornology of $X.$

A linear map between two bornological spaces is continuous if and only if it is bounded (with respect to the usual bornologies).

=== Topological rings ===
Suppose that $X$ is a commutative topological ring. A subset $S$ of $X$ is called a bounded set if for each neighborhood $U$ of the origin in $X,$ there exists a neighborhood $V$ of the origin in $X$ such that $S V \subseteq U.$

== See also ==
- Bornivorous set – Set that can absorb any bounded subset
- Bornological space – Space where bounded operators are continuous
- Coarse structure#bounded set – Concept in geometry and topology
- Space of linear maps
- Ultrabornological space
- Vector bornology
