= Vector bornology =

In mathematics, especially functional analysis, a bornology $\mathcal{B}$ on a vector space $X$ over a field $\mathbb{K},$ where $\mathbb{K}$ has a bornology ℬ_{$\mathbb{K}$}, is called a vector bornology if $\mathcal{B}$ makes the vector space operations into bounded maps.

== Definitions ==
=== Prerequisites ===
A bornology on a set $X$ is a collection $\mathcal{B}$ of subsets of $X$ that satisfy all the following conditions:

1. $\mathcal{B}$ covers $X;$ that is, $X = \cup \mathcal{B}$
2. $\mathcal{B}$ is stable under inclusions; that is, if $B \in \mathcal{B}$ and $A \subseteq B,$ then $A \in \mathcal{B}$
3. $\mathcal{B}$ is stable under finite unions; that is, if $B_1, \ldots, B_n \in \mathcal{B}$ then $B_1 \cup \cdots \cup B_n \in \mathcal{B}$

Elements of the collection $\mathcal{B}$ are called $\mathcal{B}$-bounded or simply bounded sets if $\mathcal{B}$ is understood. The pair $(X, \mathcal{B})$ is called a bounded structure or a bornological set.

A base or fundamental system of a bornology $\mathcal{B}$ is a subset $\mathcal{B}_0$ of $\mathcal{B}$ such that each element of $\mathcal{B}$ is a subset of some element of $\mathcal{B}_0.$ Given a collection $\mathcal{S}$ of subsets of $X,$ the smallest bornology containing $\mathcal{S}$ is called the bornology generated by $\mathcal{S}.$

If $(X, \mathcal{B})$ and $(Y, \mathcal{C})$ are bornological sets then their product bornology on $X \times Y$ is the bornology having as a base the collection of all sets of the form $B \times C,$ where $B \in \mathcal{B}$ and $C \in \mathcal{C}.$ A subset of $X \times Y$ is bounded in the product bornology if and only if its image under the canonical projections onto $X$ and $Y$ are both bounded.

If $(X, \mathcal{B})$ and $(Y, \mathcal{C})$ are bornological sets then a function $f : X \to Y$ is said to be a locally bounded map or a bounded map (with respect to these bornologies) if it maps $\mathcal{B}$-bounded subsets of $X$ to $\mathcal{C}$-bounded subsets of $Y;$ that is, if $f\left(\mathcal{B}\right) \subseteq \mathcal{C}.$ If in addition $f$ is a bijection and $f^{-1}$ is also bounded then $f$ is called a bornological isomorphism.

=== Vector bornology ===
Let $X$ be a vector space over a field $\mathbb{K}$ where $\mathbb{K}$ has a bornology $\mathcal{B}_{\mathbb{K}}.$ A bornology $\mathcal{B}$ on $X$ is called a vector bornology on $X$ if it is stable under vector addition, scalar multiplication, and the formation of balanced hulls (i.e. if the sum of two bounded sets is bounded, etc.).

If $X$ is a vector space and $\mathcal{B}$ is a bornology on $X,$ then the following are equivalent:

1. $\mathcal{B}$ is a vector bornology
2. Finite sums and balanced hulls of $\mathcal{B}$-bounded sets are $\mathcal{B}$-bounded
3. The scalar multiplication map $\mathbb{K} \times X \to X$ defined by $(s, x) \mapsto sx$ and the addition map $X \times X \to X$ defined by $(x, y) \mapsto x + y,$ are both bounded when their domains carry their product bornologies (i.e. they map bounded subsets to bounded subsets)

A vector bornology $\mathcal{B}$ is called a convex vector bornology if it is stable under the formation of convex hulls (i.e. the convex hull of a bounded set is bounded) then $\mathcal{B}.$ And a vector bornology $\mathcal{B}$ is called separated if the only bounded vector subspace of $X$ is the 0-dimensional trivial space $\{ 0 \}.$

Usually, $\mathbb{K}$ is either the real or complex numbers, in which case a vector bornology $\mathcal{B}$ on $X$ will be called a convex vector bornology if $\mathcal{B}$ has a base consisting of convex sets.

== Characterizations ==
Suppose that $X$ is a vector space over the field $\mathbb{F}$ of real or complex numbers and $\mathcal{B}$ is a bornology on $X.$ Then the following are equivalent:

1. $\mathcal{B}$ is a vector bornology
2. addition and scalar multiplication are bounded maps
3. the balanced hull of every element of $\mathcal{B}$ is an element of $\mathcal{B}$ and the sum of any two elements of $\mathcal{B}$ is again an element of $\mathcal{B}$

== Bornology on a topological vector space ==
If $X$ is a topological vector space then the set of all bounded subsets of $X$ from a vector bornology on $X$ called the von Neumann bornology of $X$, the usual bornology, or simply the bornology of $X$ and is referred to as natural boundedness. In any locally convex topological vector space $X,$ the set of all closed bounded disks form a base for the usual bornology of $X.$

Unless indicated otherwise, it is always assumed that the real or complex numbers are endowed with the usual bornology.

== Topology induced by a vector bornology ==
Suppose that $X$ is a vector space over the field $\mathbb{K}$ of real or complex numbers and $\mathcal{B}$ is a vector bornology on $X.$ Let $\mathcal{N}$ denote all those subsets $N$ of $X$ that are convex, balanced, and bornivorous. Then $\mathcal{N}$ forms a neighborhood basis at the origin for a locally convex topological vector space topology.

== Examples ==
=== Locally convex space of bounded functions ===
Let $\mathbb{K}$ be the real or complex numbers (endowed with their usual bornologies), let $(T, \mathcal{B})$ be a bounded structure, and let $LB(T, \mathbb{K})$ denote the vector space of all locally bounded $\mathbb{K}$-valued maps on $T.$ For every $B \in \mathcal{B},$ let $p_{B}(f) := \sup \left| f(B) \right|$ for all $f \in LB(T, \mathbb{K}),$ where this defines a seminorm on $X.$ The locally convex topological vector space topology on $LB(T, \mathbb{K})$ defined by the family of seminorms $\left\{ p_{B} : B \in \mathcal{B} \right\}$ is called the topology of uniform convergence on bounded set. This topology makes $LB(T, \mathbb{K})$ into a complete space.

=== Bornology of equicontinuity ===
Let $T$ be a topological space, $\mathbb{K}$ be the real or complex numbers, and let $C(T, \mathbb{K})$ denote the vector space of all continuous $\mathbb{K}$-valued maps on $T.$ The set of all equicontinuous subsets of $C(T, \mathbb{K})$ forms a vector bornology on $C(T, \mathbb{K}).$

== See also ==
- Bornivorous set
- Bornological space
- Bornology
- Space of linear maps
- Ultrabornological space

== Bibliography ==
- Hogbe-Nlend, Henri (1977). Bornologies and Functional Analysis: Introductory Course on the Theory of Duality Topology-Bornology and its use in Functional Analysis. North-Holland Mathematics Studies. Vol. 26. Amsterdam New York New York: North Holland. ISBN 978-0-08-087137-0. MR 0500064. OCLC 316549583.
- Kriegl, Andreas; Michor, Peter W. (1997). The Convenient Setting of Global Analysis. Mathematical Surveys and Monographs. American Mathematical Society. ISBN 978-082180780-4.
- Narici, Lawrence; Beckenstein, Edward (2011). Topological Vector Spaces. Pure and applied mathematics (Second ed.). Boca Raton, FL: CRC Press. ISBN 978-1584888666. OCLC 144216834.
- Schaefer, Helmut H.; Wolff, Manfred P. (1999). Topological Vector Spaces. GTM. Vol. 8 (Second ed.). New York, NY: Springer New York Imprint Springer. ISBN 978-1-4612-7155-0. OCLC 840278135.
