= Quasi-ultrabarrelled space =

In functional analysis and related areas of mathematics, a quasi-ultrabarrelled space is a topological vector spaces (TVS) for which every bornivorous ultrabarrel is a neighbourhood of the origin.

== Definition ==
A subset B_{0} of a TVS X is called a bornivorous ultrabarrel if it is a closed, balanced, and bornivorous subset of X and if there exists a sequence $\left( B_{i} \right)_{i=1}^{\infty}$ of closed balanced and bornivorous subsets of X such that B_{i+1} + B_{i+1} ⊆ B_{i} for all i = 0, 1, .... In this case, $\left( B_{i} \right)_{i=1}^{\infty}$ is called a defining sequence for B_{0}. A TVS X is called quasi-ultrabarrelled if every bornivorous ultrabarrel in X is a neighbourhood of the origin.

== Properties ==
A locally convex quasi-ultrabarrelled space is quasi-barrelled.

== Examples and sufficient conditions ==
Ultrabarrelled spaces and ultrabornological spaces are quasi-ultrabarrelled. Complete and metrizable TVSs are quasi-ultrabarrelled.

== See also ==
- Barrelled space
- Countably barrelled space
- Countably quasi-barrelled space
- Infrabarreled space
- Ultrabarrelled space
- Uniform boundedness principle#Generalisations
