= LB-space =

In mathematics, an LB-space, also written (LB)-space, is a topological vector space $X$ that is a locally convex inductive limit of a countable inductive system $(X_n, i_{nm})$ of Banach spaces. This means that $X$ is a direct limit of a direct system $\left( X_n, i_{nm} \right)$ in the category of locally convex topological vector spaces and each $X_n$ is a Banach space.

If each of the bonding maps $i_{nm}$ is an embedding of TVSs then the LB-space is called a strict LB-space. This means that the topology induced on $X_n$ by $X_{n+1}$ is identical to the original topology on $X_n.$ Some authors (e.g. Schaefer) define the term "LB-space" to mean "strict LB-space."

== Definition ==
The topology on $X$ can be described by specifying that an absolutely convex subset $U$ is a neighborhood of $0$ if and only if $U \cap X_n$ is an absolutely convex neighborhood of $0$ in $X_n$ for every $n.$

== Properties ==
A strict LB-space is complete, barrelled, and bornological (and thus ultrabornological).

== Examples ==
If $D$ is a locally compact topological space that is countable at infinity (that is, it is equal to a countable union of compact subspaces) then the space $C_c(D)$ of all continuous, complex-valued functions on $D$ with compact support is a strict LB-space. For any compact subset $K \subseteq D,$ let $C_c(K)$ denote the Banach space of complex-valued functions that are supported by $K$ with the uniform norm and order the family of compact subsets of $D$ by inclusion.

Final topology on the direct limit of finite-dimensional Euclidean spaces

Let

$$\begin{alignat}{4}
\R^{\infty}
~&:=~ \left\{ \left(x_1, x_2, \ldots \right) \in \R^{\N} ~:~ \text{ all but finitely many } x_i \text{ are equal to 0 } \right\},
\end{alignat}$$

denote the space of finite sequences, where $\R^{\N}$ denotes the space of all real sequences. For every natural number $n \in \N,$ let $\R^n$ denote the usual Euclidean space endowed with the Euclidean topology and let $\operatorname{In}_{\R^n} : \R^n \to \R^{\infty}$ denote the canonical inclusion defined by $\operatorname{In}_{\R^n}\left(x_1, \ldots, x_n\right) := \left(x_1, \ldots, x_n, 0, 0, \ldots \right)$ so that its image is

$$\operatorname{Im} \left( \operatorname{In}_{\R^n} \right)
= \left\{ \left(x_1, \ldots, x_n, 0, 0, \ldots \right) ~:~ x_1, \ldots, x_n \in \R \right\}
= \R^n \times \left\{ (0, 0, \ldots) \right\}$$

and consequently,

$$\R^{\infty} = \bigcup_{n \in \N} \operatorname{Im} \left( \operatorname{In}_{\R^n} \right).$$

Endow the set $\R^{\infty}$ with the final topology $\tau^{\infty}$ induced by the family $\mathcal{F} := \left\{ \; \operatorname{In}_{\R^n} ~:~ n \in \N \; \right\}$ of all canonical inclusions. With this topology, $\R^{\infty}$ becomes a complete Hausdorff locally convex sequential topological vector space that is not a Fréchet–Urysohn space. The topology $\tau^{\infty}$ is strictly finer than the subspace topology induced on $\R^{\infty}$ by $\R^{\N},$ where $\R^{\N}$ is endowed with its usual product topology. Endow the image $\operatorname{Im} \left( \operatorname{In}_{\R^n} \right)$ with the final topology induced on it by the bijection $\operatorname{In}_{\R^n} : \R^n \to \operatorname{Im} \left( \operatorname{In}_{\R^n} \right);$ that is, it is endowed with the Euclidean topology transferred to it from $\R^n$ via $\operatorname{In}_{\R^n}.$ This topology on $\operatorname{Im} \left( \operatorname{In}_{\R^n} \right)$ is equal to the subspace topology induced on it by $\left(\R^{\infty}, \tau^{\infty}\right).$ A subset $S \subseteq \R^{\infty}$ is open (resp. closed) in $\left(\R^{\infty}, \tau^{\infty}\right)$ if and only if for every $n \in \N,$ the set $S \cap \operatorname{Im} \left( \operatorname{In}_{\R^n} \right)$ is an open (resp. closed) subset of $\operatorname{Im} \left( \operatorname{In}_{\R^n} \right).$ The topology $\tau^{\infty}$ is coherent with family of subspaces $\mathbb{S} := \left\{ \; \operatorname{Im} \left( \operatorname{In}_{\R^n} \right) ~:~ n \in \N \; \right\}.$ This makes $\left(\R^{\infty}, \tau^{\infty}\right)$ into an LB-space. Consequently, if $v \in \R^{\infty}$ and $v_{\bull}$ is a sequence in $\R^{\infty}$ then $v_{\bull} \to v$ in $\left(\R^{\infty}, \tau^{\infty}\right)$ if and only if there exists some $n \in \N$ such that both $v$ and $v_{\bull}$ are contained in $\operatorname{Im} \left( \operatorname{In}_{\R^n} \right)$ and $v_{\bull} \to v$ in $\operatorname{Im} \left( \operatorname{In}_{\R^n} \right).$

Often, for every $n \in \N,$ the canonical inclusion $\operatorname{In}_{\R^n}$ is used to identify $\R^n$ with its image $\operatorname{Im} \left( \operatorname{In}_{\R^n} \right)$ in $\R^{\infty};$ explicitly, the elements $\left( x_1, \ldots, x_n \right) \in \mathbb{R}^n$ and $\left( x_1, \ldots, x_n, 0, 0, 0, \ldots \right)$ are identified together. Under this identification, $\left( \left(\R^{\infty}, \tau^{\infty}\right), \left(\operatorname{In}_{\R^n}\right)_{n \in \N}\right)$ becomes a direct limit of the direct system $\left( \left(\R^n\right)_{n \in \N}, \left(\operatorname{In}_{\R^m}^{\R^n}\right)_{m \leq n \text{ in } \N}, \N \right),$ where for every $m \leq n,$ the map $\operatorname{In}_{\R^m}^{\R^n} : \R^m \to \R^n$ is the canonical inclusion defined by $\operatorname{In}_{\R^m}^{\R^n}\left(x_1, \ldots, x_m\right) := \left(x_1, \ldots, x_m, 0, \ldots, 0 \right),$ where there are $n - m$ trailing zeros.

=== Counter-examples ===
There exists a bornological LB-space whose strong bidual is not bornological. There exists an LB-space that is not quasi-complete.

== See also ==
- DF-space – class of special local-convex space
- Direct limit – Special case of colimit in category theory
- Final topology – Finest topology making some functions continuous
- F-space – Topological vector space with a complete translation-invariant metric
- LF-space – Topological vector space
