= Bornological space =

Space where bounded operators are continuous

In mathematics, particularly in functional analysis, a bornological space is a type of space which, in some sense, possesses the minimum amount of structure needed to address questions of boundedness of sets and linear maps, in the same way that a topological space possesses the minimum amount of structure needed to address questions of continuity. Bornological spaces are distinguished by the property that a linear map from a bornological space into any locally convex spaces is continuous if and only if it is a bounded linear operator.

Bornological spaces were first studied by George Mackey. The name was coined by Bourbaki after borné, the French word for "bounded".

== Bornologies and bounded maps ==
A bornology on a set $X$ is a collection $\mathcal{B}$ of subsets of $X$ that satisfy all the following conditions:

1. $\mathcal{B}$ covers $X;$ that is, $X = \cup \mathcal{B}$;
2. $\mathcal{B}$ is stable under inclusions; that is, if $B \in \mathcal{B}$ and $A \subseteq B,$ then $A \in \mathcal{B}$;
3. $\mathcal{B}$ is stable under finite unions; that is, if $B_1, \ldots, B_n \in \mathcal{B}$ then $B_1 \cup \cdots \cup B_n \in \mathcal{B}$;

Elements of the collection $\mathcal{B}$ are called $\mathcal{B}$-bounded or simply bounded sets if $\mathcal{B}$ is understood. The pair $(X, \mathcal{B})$ is called a bounded structure or a bornological set.

A base or fundamental system of a bornology $\mathcal{B}$ is a subset $\mathcal{B}_0$ of $\mathcal{B}$ such that each element of $\mathcal{B}$ is a subset of some element of $\mathcal{B}_0.$ Given a collection $\mathcal{S}$ of subsets of $X,$ the smallest bornology containing $\mathcal{S}$ is called the bornology generated by $\mathcal{S}.$

If $(X, \mathcal{B})$ and $(Y, \mathcal{C})$ are bornological sets then their product bornology on $X \times Y$ is the bornology having as a base the collection of all sets of the form $B \times C,$ where $B \in \mathcal{B}$ and $C \in \mathcal{C}.$ A subset of $X \times Y$ is bounded in the product bornology if and only if its image under the canonical projections onto $X$ and $Y$ are both bounded.

=== Bounded maps ===
If $(X, \mathcal{B})$ and $(Y, \mathcal{C})$ are bornological sets then a function $f : X \to Y$ is said to be a locally bounded map or a bounded map (with respect to these bornologies) if it maps $\mathcal{B}$-bounded subsets of $X$ to $\mathcal{C}$-bounded subsets of $Y;$ that is, if $f(\mathcal{B}) \subseteq \mathcal{C}.$ If in addition $f$ is a bijection and $f^{-1}$ is also bounded then $f$ is called a bornological isomorphism.

== Vector bornologies ==
Let $X$ be a vector space over a field $\mathbb{K}$ where $\mathbb{K}$ has a bornology $\mathcal{B}_{\mathbb{K}}.$ A bornology $\mathcal{B}$ on $X$ is called a vector bornology on $X$ if it is stable under vector addition, scalar multiplication, and the formation of balanced hulls (i.e. if the sum of two bounded sets is bounded, etc.).

If $X$ is a topological vector space (TVS) and $\mathcal{B}$ is a bornology on $X,$ then the following are equivalent:

1. $\mathcal{B}$ is a vector bornology;
2. Finite sums and balanced hulls of $\mathcal{B}$-bounded sets are $\mathcal{B}$-bounded;
3. The scalar multiplication map $\mathbb{K} \times X \to X$ defined by $(s, x) \mapsto sx$ and the addition map $X \times X \to X$ defined by $(x, y) \mapsto x + y,$ are both bounded when their domains carry their product bornologies (i.e. they map bounded subsets to bounded subsets).

A vector bornology $\mathcal{B}$ is called a convex vector bornology if it is stable under the formation of convex hulls (i.e. the convex hull of a bounded set is bounded) then $\mathcal{B}.$ And a vector bornology $\mathcal{B}$ is called separated if the only bounded vector subspace of $X$ is the 0-dimensional trivial space $\{ 0 \}.$

Usually, $\mathbb{K}$ is either the real or complex numbers, in which case a vector bornology $\mathcal{B}$ on $X$ will be called a convex vector bornology if $\mathcal{B}$ has a base consisting of convex sets.

=== Bornivorous subsets ===
A subset $A$ of $X$ is called bornivorous and a bornivore if it absorbs every bounded set.

In a vector bornology, $A$ is bornivorous if it absorbs every bounded balanced set and in a convex vector bornology $A$ is bornivorous if it absorbs every bounded disk.

Two TVS topologies on the same vector space have that same bounded subsets if and only if they have the same bornivores.

Every bornivorous subset of a locally convex metrizable topological vector space is a neighborhood of the origin.

==== Mackey convergence ====
A sequence $x_\bull = (x_i)_{i=1}^\infty$ in a TVS $X$ is said to be Mackey convergent to $0$ if there exists a sequence of positive real numbers $r_\bull = (r_i)_{i=1}^\infty$ diverging to $\infty$ such that $(r_i x_i)_{i=1}^\infty$ converges to $0$ in $X.$

=== Bornology of a topological vector space ===
Every topological vector space $X,$ at least on a non discrete valued field gives a bornology on $X$ by defining a subset $B \subseteq X$ to be bounded (or von-Neumann bounded), if and only if for all open sets $U \subseteq X$ containing zero there exists a $r > 0$ with $B \subseteq rU.$ If $X$ is a locally convex topological vector space then $B \subseteq X$ is bounded if and only if all continuous semi-norms on $X$ are bounded on $B.$

The set of all bounded subsets of a topological vector space $X$ is called the bornology or the von Neumann bornology of $X.$

If $X$ is a locally convex topological vector space, then an absorbing disk $D$ in $X$ is bornivorous (resp. infrabornivorous) if and only if its Minkowski functional is locally bounded (resp. infrabounded).

=== Induced topology ===
If $\mathcal{B}$ is a convex vector bornology on a vector space $X,$ then the collection $\mathcal{N}_{\mathcal{B}}(0)$ of all convex balanced subsets of $X$ that are bornivorous forms a neighborhood basis at the origin for a locally convex topology on $X$ called the topology induced by $\mathcal{B}$.

If $(X, \tau)$ is a TVS then the bornological space associated with $X$ is the vector space $X$ endowed with the locally convex topology induced by the von Neumann bornology of $(X, \tau).$

Theorem—Let $X$ and $Y$ be locally convex TVS and let $X_b$ denote $X$ endowed with the topology induced by von Neumann bornology of $X.$ Define $Y_b$ similarly. Then a linear map $L : X \to Y$ is a bounded linear operator if and only if $L : X_b \to Y$ is continuous.

Moreover, if $X$ is bornological, $Y$ is Hausdorff, and $L : X \to Y$ is continuous linear map then so is $L : X \to Y_b.$ If in addition $X$ is also ultrabornological, then the continuity of $L : X \to Y$ implies the continuity of $L : X \to Y_{ub},$ where $Y_{ub}$ is the ultrabornological space associated with $Y.$

== Quasi-bornological spaces ==
Quasi-bornological spaces where introduced by S. Iyahen in 1968.

A topological vector space (TVS) $(X, \tau)$ with a continuous dual $X^{\prime}$ is called a quasi-bornological space if any of the following equivalent conditions holds:

1. Every bounded linear operator from $X$ into another TVS is continuous.
2. Every bounded linear operator from $X$ into a complete metrizable TVS is continuous.
3. Every knot in a bornivorous string is a neighborhood of the origin.

Every pseudometrizable TVS is quasi-bornological. A TVS $(X, \tau)$ in which every bornivorous set is a neighborhood of the origin is a quasi-bornological space. If $X$ is a quasi-bornological TVS then the finest locally convex topology on $X$ that is coarser than $\tau$ makes $X$ into a locally convex bornological space.

=== Bornological space ===
In functional analysis, a locally convex topological vector space is a bornological space if its topology can be recovered from its bornology in a natural way.

Every locally convex quasi-bornological space is bornological but there exist bornological spaces that are not quasi-bornological.

A topological vector space (TVS) $(X, \tau)$ with a continuous dual $X^{\prime}$ is called a bornological space if it is locally convex and any of the following equivalent conditions holds:

1. Every convex, balanced, and bornivorous set in $X$ is a neighborhood of zero.
2. Every bounded linear operator from $X$ into a locally convex TVS is continuous.
  - Recall that a linear map is bounded if and only if it maps any sequence converging to $0$ in the domain to a bounded subset of the codomain. In particular, any linear map that is sequentially continuous at the origin is bounded.
3. Every bounded linear operator from $X$ into a seminormed space is continuous.
4. Every bounded linear operator from $X$ into a Banach space is continuous.

If $X$ is a Hausdorff locally convex space then we may add to this list:

5. The locally convex topology induced by the von Neumann bornology on $X$ is the same as $\tau,$ $X$'s given topology.
6. Every bounded seminorm on $X$ is continuous.
7. Any other Hausdorff locally convex topological vector space topology on $X$ that has the same (von Neumann) bornology as $(X, \tau)$ is necessarily coarser than $\tau.$
8. $X$ is the inductive limit of normed spaces.
9. $X$ is the inductive limit of the normed spaces $X_D$ as $D$ varies over the closed and bounded disks of $X$ (or as $D$ varies over the bounded disks of $X$).
10. $X$ carries the Mackey topology $\tau(X, X^{\prime})$ and all bounded linear functionals on $X$ are continuous.
11. $X$ has both of the following properties:
  - $X$ is convex-sequential or C-sequential, which means that every convex sequentially open subset of $X$ is open,
  - $X$ is sequentially bornological or S-bornological, which means that every convex and bornivorous subset of $X$ is sequentially open.
  where a subset $A$ of $X$ is called sequentially open if every sequence converging to $0$ eventually belongs to $A.$

Every sequentially continuous linear operator from a locally convex bornological space into a locally convex TVS is continuous, where recall that a linear operator is sequentially continuous if and only if it is sequentially continuous at the origin. Thus for linear maps from a bornological space into a locally convex space, continuity is equivalent to sequential continuity at the origin. More generally, we even have the following:

- Any linear map $F : X \to Y$ from a locally convex bornological space into a locally convex space $Y$ that maps null sequences in $X$ to bounded subsets of $Y$ is necessarily continuous.

=== Sufficient conditions ===
Mackey–Ulam theorem—The product of a collection $X_\bull = ( X_i)_{i \in I}$ locally convex bornological spaces is bornological if and only if $I$ does not admit an Ulam measure.

As a consequent of the Mackey–Ulam theorem, "for all practical purposes, the product of bornological spaces is bornological."

The following topological vector spaces are all bornological:

- Any locally convex pseudometrizable TVS is bornological.
  - Thus every normed space and Fréchet space is bornological.
- Any strict inductive limit of bornological spaces, in particular any strict LF-space, is bornological.
  - This shows that there are bornological spaces that are not metrizable.
- A countable product of locally convex bornological spaces is bornological.
- Quotients of Hausdorff locally convex bornological spaces are bornological.
- The direct sum and inductive limit of Hausdorff locally convex bornological spaces is bornological.
- Fréchet Montel spaces have bornological strong duals.
- The strong dual of every reflexive Fréchet space is bornological.
- If the strong dual of a metrizable locally convex space is separable, then it is bornological.
- A vector subspace of a Hausdorff locally convex bornological space $X$ that has finite codimension in $X$ is bornological.
- The finest locally convex topology on a vector space is bornological.

Counterexamples

There exists a bornological LB-space whose strong bidual is not bornological.

A closed vector subspace of a locally convex bornological space is not necessarily bornological. There exists a closed vector subspace of a locally convex bornological space that is complete (and so sequentially complete) but neither barrelled nor bornological.

Bornological spaces need not be barrelled and barrelled spaces need not be bornological. Because every locally convex ultrabornological space is barrelled, it follows that a bornological space is not necessarily ultrabornological.

=== Properties ===
- The strong dual space of a locally convex bornological space is complete.
- Every locally convex bornological space is infrabarrelled.
- Every Hausdorff sequentially complete bornological TVS is ultrabornological.
  - Thus every complete Hausdorff bornological space is ultrabornological.
  - In particular, every Fréchet space is ultrabornological.
- The finite product of locally convex ultrabornological spaces is ultrabornological.
- Every Hausdorff bornological space is quasi-barrelled.
- Given a bornological space $X$ with continuous dual $X^{\prime},$ the topology of $X$ coincides with the Mackey topology $\tau(X, X^{\prime}).$
  - In particular, bornological spaces are Mackey spaces.
- Every quasi-complete (i.e. all closed and bounded subsets are complete) bornological space is barrelled. There exist, however, bornological spaces that are not barrelled.
- Every bornological space is the inductive limit of normed spaces (and Banach spaces if the space is also quasi-complete).
- Let $X$ be a metrizable locally convex space with continuous dual $X^{\prime}.$ Then the following are equivalent:
  1. $\beta(X^{\prime}, X)$ is bornological.
  2. $\beta(X^{\prime}, X)$ is quasi-barrelled.
  3. $\beta(X^{\prime}, X)$ is barrelled.
  4. $X$ is a distinguished space.
- If $L : X \to Y$ is a linear map between locally convex spaces and if $X$ is bornological, then the following are equivalent:
  1. $L : X \to Y$ is continuous.
  2. $L : X \to Y$ is sequentially continuous.
  3. For every set $B \subseteq X$ that's bounded in $X,$ $L(B)$ is bounded.
  4. If $x_{\bull} = (x_i)_{i=1}^\infty$ is a null sequence in $X$ then $L \circ x_\bull = (L(x_i))_{i=1}^\infty$ is a null sequence in $Y.$
  5. If $x_\bull = (x_i)_{i=1}^\infty$ is a Mackey convergent null sequence in $X$ then $L \circ x_\bull = (L(x_i))_{i=1}^\infty$ is a bounded subset of $Y.$
- Suppose that $X$ and $Y$ are locally convex TVSs and that the space of continuous linear maps $L_b(X; Y)$ is endowed with the topology of uniform convergence on bounded subsets of $X.$ If $X$ is a bornological space and if $Y$ is complete then $L_b(X; Y)$ is a complete TVS.
  - In particular, the strong dual of a locally convex bornological space is complete. However, it need not be bornological.

Subsets

- In a locally convex bornological space, every convex bornivorous set $B$ is a neighborhood of $0$ ($B$ is not required to be a disk).
- Every bornivorous subset of a locally convex metrizable topological vector space is a neighborhood of the origin.
- Closed vector subspaces of bornological space need not be bornological.

== Ultrabornological spaces ==
A disk in a topological vector space $X$ is called infrabornivorous if it absorbs all Banach disks.

If $X$ is locally convex and Hausdorff, then a disk is infrabornivorous if and only if it absorbs all compact disks.

A locally convex space is called ultrabornological if any of the following equivalent conditions hold:

1. Every infrabornivorous disk is a neighborhood of the origin.
2. $X$ is the inductive limit of the spaces $X_D$ as $D$ varies over all compact disks in $X.$
3. A seminorm on $X$ that is bounded on each Banach disk is necessarily continuous.
4. For every locally convex space $Y$ and every linear map $u : X \to Y,$ if $u$ is bounded on each Banach disk then $u$ is continuous.
5. For every Banach space $Y$ and every linear map $u : X \to Y,$ if $u$ is bounded on each Banach disk then $u$ is continuous.

=== Properties ===
The finite product of ultrabornological spaces is ultrabornological. Inductive limits of ultrabornological spaces are ultrabornological.

== See also ==
- Bornology – Mathematical generalization of boundedness
- Bornivorous set – A set that can absorb any bounded subset
- Bounded set (topological vector space) – Generalization of boundedness
- Locally convex topological vector space – Vector space with a topology defined by convex open sets
- Space of linear maps
- Topological vector space – Vector space with a notion of nearness
- Vector bornology

== Bibliography ==
- Adasch, Norbert; Ernst, Bruno; Keim, Dieter (1978). Topological Vector Spaces: The Theory Without Convexity Conditions. Lecture Notes in Mathematics. Vol. 639. Berlin New York: Springer-Verlag. ISBN 978-3-540-08662-8. OCLC 297140003.
- Berberian, Sterling K. (1974). Lectures in Functional Analysis and Operator Theory. Graduate Texts in Mathematics. Vol. 15. New York: Springer. ISBN 978-0-387-90081-0. OCLC 878109401.
- Bourbaki, Nicolas (1987) [1981]. Topological Vector Spaces: Chapters 1–5. Éléments de mathématique. Translated by Eggleston, H.G.; Madan, S. Berlin New York: Springer-Verlag. ISBN 3-540-13627-4. OCLC 17499190.
- Conway, John B. (1990). A Course in Functional Analysis. Graduate Texts in Mathematics. Vol. 96 (2nd ed.). New York: Springer-Verlag. ISBN 978-0-387-97245-9. OCLC 21195908.
- Edwards, Robert E. (1995). Functional Analysis: Theory and Applications. New York: Dover Publications. ISBN 978-0-486-68143-6. OCLC 30593138.
- Grothendieck, Alexander (1973). Topological Vector Spaces. Translated by Chaljub, Orlando. New York: Gordon and Breach Science Publishers. ISBN 978-0-677-30020-7. OCLC 886098.
- Hogbe-Nlend, Henri (1977). Bornologies and functional analysis. Amsterdam: North-Holland Publishing Co. pp. xii+144. ISBN 0-7204-0712-5. MR 0500064.
- Hogbe-Nlend, Henri (1977). Bornologies and Functional Analysis: Introductory Course on the Theory of Duality Topology-Bornology and its use in Functional Analysis. North-Holland Mathematics Studies. Vol. 26. Amsterdam New York New York: North Holland. ISBN 978-0-08-087137-0. MR 0500064. OCLC 316549583.
- Jarchow, Hans (1981). Locally convex spaces. Stuttgart: B.G. Teubner. ISBN 978-3-519-02224-4. OCLC 8210342.
- Khaleelulla, S. M. (1982). Counterexamples in Topological Vector Spaces. Lecture Notes in Mathematics. Vol. 936. Berlin, Heidelberg, New York: Springer-Verlag. ISBN 978-3-540-11565-6. OCLC 8588370.
- Köthe, Gottfried (1983) [1969]. Topological Vector Spaces I. Grundlehren der mathematischen Wissenschaften. Vol. 159. Translated by Garling, D.J.H. New York: Springer Science & Business Media. ISBN 978-3-642-64988-2. MR 0248498. OCLC 840293704.
- Kriegl, Andreas; Michor, Peter W. (1997). The Convenient Setting of Global Analysis. Mathematical Surveys and Monographs. American Mathematical Society. ISBN 9780821807804.
- Narici, Lawrence; Beckenstein, Edward (2011). Topological Vector Spaces. Pure and applied mathematics (Second ed.). Boca Raton, FL: CRC Press. ISBN 978-1584888666. OCLC 144216834.
- Schaefer, Helmut H.; Wolff, Manfred P. (1999). Topological Vector Spaces. GTM. Vol. 8 (Second ed.). New York, NY: Springer New York Imprint Springer. ISBN 978-1-4612-7155-0. OCLC 840278135.
- Schechter, Eric (1996). Handbook of Analysis and Its Foundations. San Diego, CA: Academic Press. ISBN 978-0-12-622760-4. OCLC 175294365.
- Swartz, Charles (1992). An introduction to Functional Analysis. New York: M. Dekker. ISBN 978-0-8247-8643-4. OCLC 24909067.
- Wilansky, Albert (2013). Modern Methods in Topological Vector Spaces. Mineola, New York: Dover Publications, Inc. ISBN 978-0-486-49353-4. OCLC 849801114.
