= Bornivorous set =

Set that can absorb any bounded subset

In functional analysis, a subset of a real or complex vector space $X$ that has an associated vector bornology $\mathcal{B}$ is called bornivorous and a bornivore if it absorbs every element of $\mathcal{B}.$ If $X$ is a topological vector space (TVS) then a subset $S$ of $X$ is bornivorous if it is bornivorous with respect to the von-Neumann bornology of $X$.

Bornivorous sets play an important role in the definitions of many classes of topological vector spaces, particularly bornological spaces.

== Definitions ==
If $X$ is a TVS then a subset $S$ of $X$ is called bornivorous and a bornivore if $S$ absorbs every bounded subset of $X.$

An absorbing disk in a locally convex space is bornivorous if and only if its Minkowski functional is locally bounded (i.e. maps bounded sets to bounded sets).

=== Infrabornivorous sets and infrabounded maps ===
A linear map between two TVSs is called infrabounded if it maps Banach disks to bounded disks.

A disk in $X$ is called infrabornivorous if it absorbs every Banach disk.

An absorbing disk in a locally convex space is infrabornivorous if and only if its Minkowski functional is infrabounded. A disk in a Hausdorff locally convex space is infrabornivorous if and only if it absorbs all compact disks (that is, if it is "compactivorous").

== Properties ==
Every bornivorous and infrabornivorous subset of a TVS is absorbing. In a pseudometrizable TVS, every bornivore is a neighborhood of the origin.

Two TVS topologies on the same vector space have that same bounded subsets if and only if they have the same bornivores.

Suppose $M$ is a vector subspace of finite codimension in a locally convex space $X$ and $B \subseteq M.$ If $B$ is a barrel (resp. bornivorous barrel, bornivorous disk) in $M$ then there exists a barrel (resp. bornivorous barrel, bornivorous disk) $C$ in $X$ such that $B = C \cap M.$

== Examples and sufficient conditions ==
Every neighborhood of the origin in a TVS is bornivorous. The convex hull, closed convex hull, and balanced hull of a bornivorous set is again bornivorous. The preimage of a bornivore under a bounded linear map is a bornivore.

If $X$ is a TVS in which every bounded subset is contained in a finite dimensional vector subspace, then every absorbing set is a bornivore.

=== Counter-examples ===
Let $X$ be $\mathbb{R}^2$ as a vector space over the reals. If $S$ is the balanced hull of the closed line segment between $(-1, 1)$ and $(1, 1)$ then $S$ is not bornivorous but the convex hull of $S$ is bornivorous. If $T$ is the closed and "filled" triangle with vertices $(-1, -1), (-1, 1),$ and $(1, 1)$ then $T$ is a convex set that is not bornivorous but its balanced hull is bornivorous.

== See also ==
- Bounded linear operator – Kind of linear transformation
- Bounded set (topological vector space) – Generalization of boundedness
- Bornological space – Space where bounded operators are continuous
- Bornology – Mathematical generalization of boundedness
- Space of linear maps
- Ultrabornological space
- Vector bornology

== Bibliography ==
- Adasch, Norbert; Ernst, Bruno; Keim, Dieter (1978). Topological Vector Spaces: The Theory Without Convexity Conditions. Lecture Notes in Mathematics. Vol. 639. Berlin New York: Springer-Verlag. ISBN 978-3-540-08662-8. OCLC 297140003.
- Berberian, Sterling K. (1974). Lectures in Functional Analysis and Operator Theory. Graduate Texts in Mathematics. Vol. 15. New York: Springer. ISBN 978-0-387-90081-0. OCLC 878109401.
- Bourbaki, Nicolas (1987) [1981]. Topological Vector Spaces: Chapters 1–5. Éléments de mathématique. Translated by Eggleston, H.G.; Madan, S. Berlin New York: Springer-Verlag. ISBN 3-540-13627-4. OCLC 17499190.
- Conway, John B. (1990). A Course in Functional Analysis. Graduate Texts in Mathematics. Vol. 96 (2nd ed.). New York: Springer-Verlag. ISBN 978-0-387-97245-9. OCLC 21195908.
- Edwards, Robert E. (1995). Functional Analysis: Theory and Applications. New York: Dover Publications. ISBN 978-0-486-68143-6. OCLC 30593138.
- Grothendieck, Alexander (1973). Topological Vector Spaces. Translated by Chaljub, Orlando. New York: Gordon and Breach Science Publishers. ISBN 978-0-677-30020-7. OCLC 886098.
- Hogbe-Nlend, Henri (1977). Bornologies and Functional Analysis: Introductory Course on the Theory of Duality Topology-Bornology and its use in Functional Analysis. North-Holland Mathematics Studies. Vol. 26. Amsterdam New York New York: North Holland. ISBN 978-0-08-087137-0. MR 0500064. OCLC 316549583.
- Jarchow, Hans (1981). Locally convex spaces. Stuttgart: B.G. Teubner. ISBN 978-3-519-02224-4. OCLC 8210342.
- Köthe, Gottfried (1983) [1969]. Topological Vector Spaces I. Grundlehren der mathematischen Wissenschaften. Vol. 159. Translated by Garling, D.J.H. New York: Springer Science & Business Media. ISBN 978-3-642-64988-2. MR 0248498. OCLC 840293704.
- Khaleelulla, S. M. (1982). Counterexamples in Topological Vector Spaces. Lecture Notes in Mathematics. Vol. 936. Berlin, Heidelberg, New York: Springer-Verlag. ISBN 978-3-540-11565-6. OCLC 8588370.
- Kriegl, Andreas; Michor, Peter W. (1997). The Convenient Setting of Global Analysis (PDF). Mathematical Surveys and Monographs. Vol. 53. Providence, R.I: American Mathematical Society. ISBN 978-0-8218-0780-4. OCLC 37141279.
- Narici, Lawrence; Beckenstein, Edward (2011). Topological Vector Spaces. Pure and applied mathematics (Second ed.). Boca Raton, FL: CRC Press. ISBN 978-1584888666. OCLC 144216834.
- Schaefer, Helmut H.; Wolff, Manfred P. (1999). Topological Vector Spaces. GTM. Vol. 8 (Second ed.). New York, NY: Springer New York Imprint Springer. ISBN 978-1-4612-7155-0. OCLC 840278135.
- Wilansky, Albert (2013). Modern Methods in Topological Vector Spaces. Mineola, New York: Dover Publications, Inc. ISBN 978-0-486-49353-4. OCLC 849801114.
