= Ultrabornological space =

In functional analysis, a topological vector space (TVS) $X$ is called ultrabornological if every bounded linear operator from $X$ into another TVS is necessarily continuous. A general version of the closed graph theorem holds for ultrabornological spaces. Ultrabornological spaces were introduced by Alexander Grothendieck (Grothendieck [1955, p. 17] "espace du type (β)").

== Definitions ==
Let $X$ be a topological vector space (TVS).

=== Preliminaries ===
A disk is a convex and balanced set. A disk in a TVS $X$ is called bornivorous if it absorbs every bounded subset of $X.$

A linear map between two TVSs is called infrabounded if it maps Banach disks to bounded disks.

A disk $D$ in a TVS $X$ is called infrabornivorous if it satisfies any of the following equivalent conditions:

1. $D$ absorbs every Banach disks in $X.$

while if $X$ locally convex then we may add to this list:

2. the gauge of $D$ is an infrabounded map;

while if $X$ locally convex and Hausdorff then we may add to this list:

3. $D$ absorbs all compact disks; that is, $D$ is "compactivorious".

=== Ultrabornological space ===
A TVS $X$ is ultrabornological if it satisfies any of the following equivalent conditions:

1. every infrabornivorous disk in $X$ is a neighborhood of the origin;

while if $X$ is a locally convex space then we may add to this list:

2. every bounded linear operator from $X$ into a complete metrizable TVS is necessarily continuous;
3. every infrabornivorous disk is a neighborhood of 0;
4. $X$ be the inductive limit of the spaces $X_D$ as D varies over all compact disks in $X$;
5. a seminorm on $X$ that is bounded on each Banach disk is necessarily continuous;
6. for every locally convex space $Y$ and every linear map $u : X \to Y,$ if $u$ is bounded on each Banach disk then $u$ is continuous;
7. for every Banach space $Y$ and every linear map $u : X \to Y,$ if $u$ is bounded on each Banach disk then $u$ is continuous.

while if $X$ is a Hausdorff locally convex space then we may add to this list:

8. $X$ is an inductive limit of Banach spaces;

== Properties ==
Every locally convex ultrabornological space is barrelled, quasi-ultrabarrelled space, and a bornological space but there exist bornological spaces that are not ultrabornological.

- Every ultrabornological space $X$ is the inductive limit of a family of nuclear Fréchet spaces, spanning $X.$
- Every ultrabornological space $X$ is the inductive limit of a family of nuclear DF-spaces, spanning $X.$

== Examples and sufficient conditions ==
The finite product of locally convex ultrabornological spaces is ultrabornological. Inductive limits of ultrabornological spaces are ultrabornological.

Every Hausdorff sequentially complete bornological space is ultrabornological. Thus every complete Hausdorff bornological space is ultrabornological. In particular, every Fréchet space is ultrabornological.

The strong dual space of a complete Schwartz space is ultrabornological.

Every Hausdorff bornological space that is quasi-complete is ultrabornological.

Counter-examples

There exist ultrabarrelled spaces that are not ultrabornological. There exist ultrabornological spaces that are not ultrabarrelled.

== See also ==
- Bounded linear operator – Kind of linear transformation
- Bounded set (topological vector space) – Generalization of boundedness
- Bornological space – Space where bounded operators are continuous
- Bornology – Mathematical generalization of boundedness
- Locally convex topological vector space – Vector space with a topology defined by convex open sets
- Space of linear maps
- Topological vector space – Vector space with a notion of nearness
- Vector bornology
