= LF-space =

Topological vector space

In mathematics, an LF-space, also written (LF)-space, is a topological vector space (TVS) X that is a locally convex inductive limit of a countable inductive system $(X_n, i_{nm})$ of Fréchet spaces. This means that X is a direct limit of a direct system $(X_n, i_{nm})$ in the category of locally convex topological vector spaces and each $X_n$ is a Fréchet space. The name LF stands for Limit of Fréchet spaces.

If each of the bonding maps $i_{nm}$ is an embedding of TVSs then the LF-space is called a strict LF-space. This means that the subspace topology induced on X_{n} by X_{n+1} is identical to the original topology on X_{n}. Some authors (e.g. Schaefer) define the term "LF-space" to mean "strict LF-space," so when reading mathematical literature, it is recommended to always check how LF-space is defined.

== Definition ==
=== Inductive/final/direct limit topology ===
Throughout, it is assumed that

- $\mathcal{C}$ is either the category of topological spaces or some subcategory of the category of topological vector spaces (TVSs);
  - If all objects in the category have an algebraic structure, then all morphisms are assumed to be homomorphisms for that algebraic structure.
- I is a non-empty directed set;
- X_{•} = ( X_{i} )_{i ∈ I} is a family of objects in $\mathcal{C}$ where (X_{i}, τ_{X_{i}}) is a topological space for every index i;
  - To avoid potential confusion, τ_{X_{i}} should not be called X_{i}'s "initial topology" since the term "initial topology" already has a well-known definition. The topology τ_{X_{i}} is called the original topology on X_{i} or X_{i}'s given topology.
- X is a set (and if objects in $\mathcal{C}$ also have algebraic structures, then X is automatically assumed to have whatever algebraic structure is needed);
- f_{•} = ( f_{i} )_{i ∈ I} is a family of maps where for each index i, the map has prototype f_{i} : (X_{i}, τ_{X_{i}}) → X. If all objects in the category have an algebraic structure, then these maps are also assumed to be homomorphisms for that algebraic structure.

If it exists, then the final topology on X in $\mathcal{C}$, also called the colimit or inductive topology in $\mathcal{C}$, and denoted by τ_{f_{•}} or τ_{f}, is the finest topology on X such that

1. (X, τ_{f}) is an object in $\mathcal{C}$, and
2. for every index i, the map f_{i} : (X_{i}, τ_{X_{i}}) → (X, τ_{f}) is a continuous morphism in $\mathcal{C}$.

In the category of topological spaces, the final topology always exists and moreover, a subset U ⊆ X is open (resp. closed) in (X, τ_{f}) if and only if f_{i}^{- 1} (U) is open (resp. closed) in (X_{i}, τ_{X_{i}}) for every index i.

However, the final topology may not exist in the category of Hausdorff topological spaces due to the requirement that (X, τ_{X_{f}}) belong to the original category (i.e. belong to the category of Hausdorff topological spaces).

=== Direct systems ===
Suppose that (I, ≤) is a directed set and that for all indices i ≤ j there are (continuous) morphisms in $\mathcal{C}$

f_{i}^{j} : X_{i} → X_{j}

such that if i = j then f_{i}^{j} is the identity map on X_{i} and if i ≤ j ≤ k then the following compatibility condition is satisfied:

f_{i}^{k} = f_{j}^{k} ∘ f_{i}^{j},

where this means that the composition

$X_{i} \xrightarrow{f_i^j} X_{j} \xrightarrow{f_j^k} X_{k} \;\;\;\; \text{ is equal to } \;\;\;\; X_{i} \xrightarrow{f_i^k} X_{k}.$

If the above conditions are satisfied then the triple formed by the collections of these objects, morphisms, and the indexing set

$\left( X_{\bull}, \left \{f_{i}^{j} \;:\; i, j \in I \;\text{ and }\; i \le j \right \}, I \right)$

is known as a direct system in the category $\mathcal{C}$ that is directed (or indexed) by I. Since the indexing set I is a directed set, the direct system is said to be directed. The maps f_{i}^{j} are called the bonding, connecting, or linking maps of the system.

If the indexing set I is understood then I is often omitted from the above tuple (i.e. not written); the same is true for the bonding maps if they are understood. Consequently, one often sees written "X_{•} is a direct system" where "X_{•}" actually represents a triple with the bonding maps and indexing set either defined elsewhere (e.g. canonical bonding maps, such as natural inclusions) or else the bonding maps are merely assumed to exist but there is no need to assign symbols to them (e.g. the bonding maps are not needed to state a theorem).

=== Direct limit of a direct system ===
For the construction of a direct limit of a general inductive system, please see the article: direct limit.

Direct limits of injective systems

If each of the bonding maps $f_{i}^{j}$ is injective then the system is called injective.

Assumptions: In the case where the direct system is injective, it is often assumed without loss of generality that for all indices i ≤ j, each X_{i} is a vector subspace of X_{j} (in particular, X_{i} is identified with the range of $f_{i}^{j}$) and that the bonding map $f_{i}^{j}$ is the natural inclusion
In^{j}_{i} : X_{i} → X_{j}

(i.e. defined by x ↦ x) so that the subspace topology on X_{i} induced by X_{j} is weaker (i.e. coarser) than the original (i.e. given) topology on X_{i}.

In this case, also take

X := X_{i}.
The limit maps are then the natural inclusions In_{i} : X_{i} → X. The direct limit topology on X is the final topology induced by these inclusion maps.

If the X_{i}'s have an algebraic structure, say addition for example, then for any x, y ∈ X, we pick any index i such that x, y ∈ X_{i} and then define their sum using by using the addition operator of X_{i}. That is,

x + y := x +_{i} y,

where +_{i} is the addition operator of X_{i}. This sum is independent of the index i that is chosen.

In the category of locally convex topological vector spaces, the topology on the direct limit X of an injective directed inductive limit of locally convex spaces can be described by specifying that an absolutely convex subset U of X is a neighborhood of 0 if and only if U ∩ X_{i} is an absolutely convex neighborhood of 0 in X_{i} for every index i.

Direct limits in Top

Direct limits of directed direct systems always exist in the categories of sets, topological spaces, groups, and locally convex TVSs. In the category of topological spaces, if every bonding map f_{i}^{j} is/is a injective (resp. surjective, bijective, homeomorphism, topological embedding, quotient map) then so is every f_{i} : X_{i} → X.

==== Problem with direct limits ====
Direct limits in the categories of topological spaces, topological vector spaces (TVSs), and Hausdorff locally convex TVSs are "poorly behaved". For instance, the direct limit of a sequence (i.e. indexed by the natural numbers) of locally convex nuclear Fréchet spaces may fail to be Hausdorff (in which case the direct limit does not exist in the category of Hausdorff TVSs). For this reason, only certain "well-behaved" direct systems are usually studied in functional analysis. Such systems include LF-spaces. However, non-Hausdorff locally convex inductive limits do occur in natural questions of analysis.

=== Strict inductive limit ===
If each of the bonding maps $f_{i}^{j}$ is an embedding of TVSs onto proper vector subspaces and if the system is directed by $\mathbb{N}$ with its natural ordering, then the resulting limit is called a strict (countable) direct limit. In such a situation we may assume without loss of generality that each X_{i} is a vector subspace of X_{i+1} and that the subspace topology induced on X_{i} by X_{i+1} is identical to the original topology on X_{i}.

== Properties ==
An inductive limit in the category of locally convex TVSs of a family of bornological (resp. barrelled, quasi-barrelled) spaces has this same property.

=== LF-spaces ===
Every LF-space is a meager subset of itself. The strict inductive limit of a sequence of complete locally convex spaces (such as Fréchet spaces) is necessarily complete. In particular, every LF-space is complete. Every LF-space is barrelled and bornological, which together with completeness implies that every LF-space is ultrabornological. An LF-space that is the inductive limit of a countable sequence of separable spaces is separable. LF spaces are distinguished and their strong duals are bornological and barrelled (a result due to Alexander Grothendieck).

If X is the strict inductive limit of an increasing sequence of Fréchet space X_{n} then a subset B of X is bounded in X if and only if there exists some n such that B is a bounded subset of X_{n}.

A linear map from an LF-space into another TVS is continuous if and only if it is sequentially continuous. A linear map from an LF-space X into a Fréchet space Y is continuous if and only if its graph is closed in X × Y. Every bounded linear operator from an LF-space into another TVS is continuous.

If X is an LF-space defined by a sequence $\left( X_i \right)_{i=1}^{\infty}$ then the strong dual space $X^{\prime}_{b}$ of X is a Fréchet space if and only if all X_{i} are normable. Thus the strong dual space of an LF-space is a Fréchet space if and only if it is an LB-space.

== Examples ==
=== Space of smooth compactly supported functions ===
A typical example of an LF-space is, $C^\infty_c(\mathbb{R}^n)$, the space of all infinitely differentiable functions on $\mathbb{R}^n$ with compact support. The LF-space structure is obtained by considering a sequence of compact sets $K_1 \subset K_2 \subset \ldots \subset K_i \subset \ldots \subset \mathbb{R}^n$ with $\bigcup_i K_i = \mathbb{R}^n$ and for all i, $K_i$ is a subset of the interior of $K_{i+1}$. Such a sequence could be the balls of radius i centered at the origin. The space $C_c^\infty(K_i)$ of infinitely differentiable functions on $\mathbb{R}^n$ with compact support contained in $K_i$ has a natural Fréchet space structure and $C^\infty_c(\mathbb{R}^n)$ inherits its LF-space structure as described above. The LF-space topology does not depend on the particular sequence of compact sets $K_i$.

With this LF-space structure, $C^\infty_c(\mathbb{R}^n)$ is known as the space of test functions, of fundamental importance in the theory of distributions.

=== Direct limit of finite-dimensional spaces ===
Suppose that for every positive integer n, X_{n} := $\mathbb{R}$^{n} and for m < n, consider X_{m} as a vector subspace of X_{n} via the canonical embedding X_{m} → X_{n} defined by x := (x_{1}, ..., x_{m}) ↦ (x_{1}, ..., x_{m}, 0, ..., 0). Denote the resulting LF-space by X. Since any TVS topology on X makes continuous the inclusions of the X_{m}'s into X, the latter space has the maximum among all TVS topologies on an $\mathbb{R}$-vector space with countable Hamel dimension. It is a LC topology, associated with the family of all seminorms on X. Also, the TVS inductive limit topology of X coincides with the topological inductive limit; that is, the direct limit of the finite dimensional spaces X_{n} in the category TOP and in the category TVS coincide. The continuous dual space $X^{\prime}$ of X is equal to the algebraic dual space of X, that is the space of all real valued sequences $\mathbb{R}^\mathbb{N}$ and the weak topology on $X^{\prime}$ is equal to the strong topology on $X^{\prime}$ (i.e. $X^{\prime}_{\sigma} = X^{\prime}_{b}$). In fact, it is the unique LC topology on $X^{\prime}$ whose topological dual space is X.

== See also ==
- DF-space
- Direct limit
- Final topology
- F-space
- LB-space

== Bibliography ==
- Adasch, Norbert; Ernst, Bruno; Keim, Dieter (1978). Topological Vector Spaces: The Theory Without Convexity Conditions. Lecture Notes in Mathematics. Vol. 639. Berlin New York: Springer-Verlag. ISBN 978-3-540-08662-8. OCLC 297140003.
- Bierstedt, Klaus-Dieter (1988). "An Introduction to Locally Convex Inductive Limits". Functional Analysis and Applications. Singapore-New Jersey-Hong Kong: Universitätsbibliothek: 35–133.
- Bourbaki, Nicolas (1987) [1981]. Topological Vector Spaces: Chapters 1–5. Éléments de mathématique. Translated by Eggleston, H.G.; Madan, S. Berlin New York: Springer-Verlag. ISBN 3-540-13627-4. OCLC 17499190.
- Dugundji, James (1966). Topology. Boston: Allyn and Bacon. ISBN 978-0-697-06889-7. OCLC 395340485.
- Edwards, Robert E. (1995). Functional Analysis: Theory and Applications. New York: Dover Publications. ISBN 978-0-486-68143-6. OCLC 30593138.
- Grothendieck, Alexander (1973). Topological Vector Spaces. Translated by Chaljub, Orlando. New York: Gordon and Breach Science Publishers. ISBN 978-0-677-30020-7. OCLC 886098.
- Horváth, John (1966). Topological Vector Spaces and Distributions. Addison-Wesley series in mathematics. Vol. 1. Reading, MA: Addison-Wesley Publishing Company. ISBN 978-0201029857.
- Jarchow, Hans (1981). Locally convex spaces. Stuttgart: B.G. Teubner. ISBN 978-3-519-02224-4. OCLC 8210342.
- Khaleelulla, S. M. (1982). Counterexamples in Topological Vector Spaces. Lecture Notes in Mathematics. Vol. 936. Berlin, Heidelberg, New York: Springer-Verlag. ISBN 978-3-540-11565-6. OCLC 8588370.
- Köthe, Gottfried (1983) [1969]. Topological Vector Spaces I. Grundlehren der mathematischen Wissenschaften. Vol. 159. Translated by Garling, D.J.H. New York: Springer Science & Business Media. ISBN 978-3-642-64988-2. MR 0248498. OCLC 840293704.
- Köthe, Gottfried (1979). Topological Vector Spaces II. Grundlehren der mathematischen Wissenschaften. Vol. 237. New York: Springer Science & Business Media. ISBN 978-0-387-90400-9. OCLC 180577972.
- Narici, Lawrence; Beckenstein, Edward (2011). Topological Vector Spaces. Pure and applied mathematics (Second ed.). Boca Raton, FL: CRC Press. ISBN 978-1584888666. OCLC 144216834.
- Robertson, Alex P.; Robertson, Wendy J. (1980). Topological Vector Spaces. Cambridge Tracts in Mathematics. Vol. 53. Cambridge England: Cambridge University Press. ISBN 978-0-521-29882-7. OCLC 589250.
- Schaefer, Helmut H.; Wolff, Manfred P. (1999). Topological Vector Spaces. GTM. Vol. 8 (Second ed.). New York, NY: Springer New York Imprint Springer. ISBN 978-1-4612-7155-0. OCLC 840278135.
- Schechter, Eric (1996). Handbook of Analysis and Its Foundations. San Diego, CA: Academic Press. ISBN 978-0-12-622760-4. OCLC 175294365.
- Swartz, Charles (1992). An introduction to Functional Analysis. New York: M. Dekker. ISBN 978-0-8247-8643-4. OCLC 24909067.
- Trèves, François (2006) [1967]. Topological Vector Spaces, Distributions and Kernels. Mineola, N.Y.: Dover Publications. ISBN 978-0-486-45352-1. OCLC 853623322.
- Valdivia, Manuel (1982). Nachbin, Leopoldo (ed.). Topics in Locally Convex Spaces. Vol. 67. Amsterdam New York, N.Y.: Elsevier Science Pub. Co. ISBN 978-0-08-087178-3. OCLC 316568534.
- Voigt, Jürgen (2020). A Course on Topological Vector Spaces. Compact Textbooks in Mathematics. Cham: Birkhäuser Basel. ISBN 978-3-030-32945-7. OCLC 1145563701.
- Wilansky, Albert (2013). Modern Methods in Topological Vector Spaces. Mineola, New York: Dover Publications, Inc. ISBN 978-0-486-49353-4. OCLC 849801114.
