= Coarse structure =

Concept in geometry and topology

In the mathematical fields of geometry and topology, a coarse structure on a set X is a collection of subsets of the cartesian product X × X with certain properties which allow the large-scale structure of metric spaces and topological spaces to be defined.

The concern of traditional geometry and topology is with the small-scale structure of the space: properties such as the continuity of a function depend on whether the inverse images of small open sets, or neighborhoods, are themselves open. Large-scale properties of a space—such as boundedness, or the degrees of freedom of the space—do not depend on such features. Coarse geometry and coarse topology provide tools for measuring the large-scale properties of a space, and just as a metric or a topology contains information on the small-scale structure of a space, a coarse structure contains information on its large-scale properties.

Properly, a coarse structure is not the large-scale analog of a topological structure, but of a uniform structure.

== Definition ==
A coarse structure on a set $X$ is a collection $\mathbf{E}$ of subsets of $X \times X$ (therefore falling under the more general categorization of binary relations on $X$) called controlled sets, and so that $\mathbf{E}$ possesses the identity relation, is closed under taking subsets, inverses, and finite unions, and is closed under composition of relations. Explicitly:

1. Identity/diagonal:
  The diagonal $\Delta = \{(x, x) : x \in X\}$ is a member of $\mathbf{E}$—the identity relation.
2. Closed under taking subsets:
  If $E \in \mathbf{E}$ and $F \subseteq E,$ then $F \in \mathbf{E}.$
3. Closed under taking inverses:
  If $E \in \mathbf{E}$ then the inverse (or transpose) $E^{-1} = \{(y, x) : (x, y) \in E\}$ is a member of $\mathbf{E}$—the inverse relation.
4. Closed under taking unions:
  If $E, F \in \mathbf{E}$ then their union $E \cup F$ is a member of$\mathbf{E}.$
5. Closed under composition:
  If $E, F \in \mathbf{E}$ then their product $E \circ F = \{(x, y) : \text{ there exists } z \in X \text{ such that } (x, z) \in E \text{ and } (z, y) \in F\}$ is a member of $\mathbf{E}$—the composition of relations.

A set $X$ endowed with a coarse structure $\mathbf{E}$ is a coarse space.

Let $E \in \mathbf{E}$ a controlled set. For a subset $K$ of $X,$ the set $E[K]$ is defined as $\{x \in X : (x, k) \in E \text{ for some } k \in K\}.$ We define the section of $E$ by $x$ to be the set $E[\{x\}],$ also denoted $E_x.$ The symbol $E^y$ denotes the set $E^{-1}[\{y\}].$ These are forms of projections.

A subset $B$ of $X$ is said to be a bounded set if $B \times B$ is a controlled set.

=== Intuition ===
The controlled sets are "small" sets, or "negligible sets": a set $A$ such that $A \times A$ is controlled is negligible, while a function $f : X \to X$ such that its graph is controlled is "close" to the identity. In the bounded coarse structure, these sets are the bounded sets, and the functions are the ones that are a finite distance from the identity in the uniform metric.

== Coarse maps ==
Given a set $S$ and a coarse structure $X,$ we say that the maps $f : S \to X$ and $g : S \to X$ are close if $\{(f(s), g(s)) : s \in S\}$ is a controlled set.

For coarse structures $X$ and $Y,$ we say that $f : X \to Y$ is a coarse map if for each bounded set $B$ of $Y$ the set $f^{-1}(B)$ is bounded in $X$ and for each controlled set $E$ of $X$ the set $(f \times f)(E)$ is controlled in $Y.$ $X$ and $Y$ are said to be coarsely equivalent if there exists coarse maps $f : X \to Y$ and $g : Y \to X$ such that $f \circ g$ is close to $\operatorname{id}_Y$ and $g \circ f$ is close to $\operatorname{id}_X.$

== Examples ==
- The bounded coarse structure on a metric space $(X, d)$ is the collection $\mathbf{E}$ of all subsets $E$ of $X \times X$ such that $\sup_{(x, y) \in E} d(x, y)$ is finite. With this structure, the integer lattice $\Z^n$ is coarsely equivalent to $n$-dimensional Euclidean space. This has remarkable implications in solid state physics, in particular in the field of topological insulators.
- A space $X$ where $X \times X$ is controlled is called a bounded space. Such a space is coarsely equivalent to a point. A metric space with the bounded coarse structure is bounded (as a coarse space) if and only if it is bounded (as a metric space).
- The trivial coarse structure only consists of the diagonal and its subsets. In this structure, a map is a coarse equivalence if and only if it is a bijection (of sets).
- The $C_0$ coarse structure on a metric space $(X, d)$ is the collection of all subsets $E$ of $X \times X$ such that for all $\varepsilon > 0$ there is a compact set $K$ of $E$ such that $d(x, y) < \varepsilon$ for all $(x, y) \in E \setminus K \times K.$ Alternatively, the collection of all subsets $E$ of $X \times X$ such that $\overline{\{(x, y) \in E : d(x, y) \geq \varepsilon\}}$ is compact.
- The discrete coarse structure on a set $X$ consists of the diagonal $\Delta$ together with subsets $E$ of $X \times X$ which contain only a finite number of points $(x, y)$ off the diagonal.
- If $X$ is a topological space then the indiscrete coarse structure on $X$ consists of all proper subsets of $X \times X,$ meaning all subsets $E$ such that $E[K]$ and $E^{-1}[K]$ are relatively compact whenever $K$ is relatively compact.

== Bounded sets ==
Let $\mathcal{B} = \{B\subseteq X : B\times B\in\mathbf{E}\}$ be the collection of all bounded sets of a coarse space $X$. Say that a coarse structure $\mathbf{E}$ on $X$ is coarsely connected if $\{(x, y)\}\in\mathbf{E}$ for all $(x, y)\in X\times X$. Then $\mathcal{B}$ is a bornology on $X$ if and only if $\mathbf{E}$ is coarsely connected. For example, if $X$ has at least two points and $\mathbf{E}$ is the trivial coarse structure, then $\mathcal{B}$ is not a bornology. Bounded, discrete and indiscrete coarse structures are coarsely connected.

== See also ==
- Bornology – Mathematical generalization of boundedness
- Quasi-isometry – Function between two metric spaces that only respects their large-scale geometry
- Uniform space – Topological space with a notion of uniform properties
