= Bounded operator =

Kind of linear transformation

In functional analysis and operator theory, a bounded linear operator is a special kind of linear transformation that is particularly important in infinite dimensions. In finite dimensions, a linear transformation takes a bounded set to another bounded set (for example, a rectangle in the plane goes either to a parallelogram or bounded line segment when a linear transformation is applied). However, in infinite dimensions, linearity is not enough to ensure that bounded sets remain bounded: a bounded linear operator is thus a linear transformation that sends bounded sets to bounded sets.

Formally, it is a linear transformation $L : X \to Y$ between topological vector spaces (TVSs) $X$ and $Y$ that maps bounded subsets of $X$ to bounded subsets of $Y.$ If $X$ and $Y$ are normed vector spaces (a special type of TVS), then $L$ is bounded if and only if there exists some $M \ge 0$ such that for all $x \in X,$
$$\|Lx\|_Y \leq M \|x\|_X.$$
The infimum such $M$ is called the operator norm of $L$ and denoted by $\|L\|.$ A linear operator between normed spaces is continuous if and only if it is bounded.

The concept of a bounded linear operator has been extended from normed spaces to all topological vector spaces.

Outside of functional analysis, when a function $f : X \to Y$ is called "bounded" then this usually means that its image $f(X)$ is a bounded subset of its codomain. A linear map has this property if and only if it is identically $0.$ Consequently, in functional analysis, when a linear operator is called "bounded" then it is never meant in this abstract sense (of having a bounded image).

== In normed vector spaces ==
Every bounded operator is Lipschitz continuous at $0.$

=== Equivalence of boundedness and continuity ===
A linear operator between normed spaces is bounded if and only if it is continuous.

Proof

Suppose that $L$ is bounded. Then, for all vectors $x, h \in X$ with $h$ nonzero we have
$$\|L(x + h) - L(x)\| = \|L(h)\| \leq M\|h\|.$$
Letting $h$ go to zero shows that $L$ is continuous at $x.$ Moreover, since the constant $M$ does not depend on $x,$ this shows that in fact $L$ is uniformly continuous, and even Lipschitz continuous.

Conversely, it follows from the continuity at the zero vector that there exists a $\varepsilon > 0$ such that $\|L(h)\| = \|L(h) - L(0)\| \leq 1$ for all vectors $h \in X$ with $\|h\| \leq \varepsilon.$ Thus, for all non-zero $x \in X,$ one has
$$\|Lx\| = \left\Vert {\|x\| \over \varepsilon} L\left(\varepsilon {x \over \|x\|}\right) \right\Vert = {\|x\| \over \varepsilon}\left\Vert L\left(\varepsilon {x \over \|x\|}\right) \right\Vert \leq {\|x\| \over \varepsilon} \cdot 1  = {1 \over \varepsilon}\|x\|.$$
This proves that $L$ is bounded. Q.E.D.

=== Relative boundedness ===
Given two partially defined linear operators $A: D(A) \subset X \to Y, B: D(B) \subset X \to Y$, we say that $B$ is relatively bounded by $A$ (or that $B$ is $A$-bounded), iff $D(B) \subset D(A)$, and there exists $a, b \geq 0$, such that
$$\|Bx\| \leq a\|Ax\| + b \|x\|, \quad \forall x \in D(B)$$
The infimum of all such $a$ is the relative $A$-bound of $B$.

== In Hilbert spaces ==
Since Hilbert spaces are complete normed spaces with the norm induced by the inner product, the previous applies here as well. Notably, the space of bounded linear operators $L(H)$ on a Hilbert space H becomes a C*-algebra and especially an operator space. It is possible to define various different notions of boundedness for an operator T.

For example, T is called power bounded if $\|T^n\|_{L(H)} < \infty$ for all natural numbers n. This condition implies that T is bounded, of course, but the converse need not be true.

Another boundedness condition is that of polynomial boundedness: an operator T on L(H) is polynomially bounded if there exists a positive constant $K$ (that depends only on T) such that
$$\|p(T)\|_{L(H)} \leq K \sup_{|z| \leq 1}|p(z)|$$
for all (analytic) polynomials p that are defined on the closed unit disk $\overline{\mathbb{D}}$. Again this condition implies power boundedness and norm boundedness, but the converse need not be true.

Furthermore, an operator $T \colon H \to H$ is called completely polynomially bounded if there exists a positive constant K such that
$$\|P(T)\|_{M_{n\times n}(B(H))} \leq K \sup_{|z| \leq 1}\|P(z)\|_{M_{n \times n}}$$
for all matrices of (analytic) polynomials $P = (p_{ij})_{1 \leq i,j \leq n}$ and for all natural numbers n. Here, the respective matrix norms are naturally induced by the structure of the space of $n \times n$ matrices and $P(T)$ can be understood as the polynomial functional calculus. Every completely polynomially bounded operator is polynomially- and power bounded, as well as norm bounded, but the opposite does not hold in general.

Positive examples of completely polynomially bounded operators are contractive operators T, namely those for which
$$\|T\|_{L(H)} \leq 1$$
holds true.

== In topological vector spaces ==
A linear operator $F : X \to Y$ between two topological vector spaces (TVSs) is called a bounded linear operator or just bounded if whenever $B \subseteq X$ is bounded in $X$ then $F(B)$ is bounded in $Y.$ A subset of a TVS is called bounded (or more precisely, von Neumann bounded) if every neighborhood of the origin absorbs it. In a normed space (and even in a seminormed space), a subset is von Neumann bounded if and only if it is norm bounded. Hence, for normed spaces, the notion of a von Neumann bounded set is identical to the usual notion of a norm-bounded subset.

=== Continuity and boundedness ===
Every sequentially continuous linear operator between TVS is a bounded operator. This implies that every continuous linear operator between metrizable TVS is bounded. However, in general, a bounded linear operator between two TVSs need not be continuous.

This formulation allows one to define bounded operators between general topological vector spaces as an operator which takes bounded sets to bounded sets. In this context, it is still true that every continuous map is bounded, however the converse fails; a bounded operator need not be continuous. This also means that boundedness is no longer equivalent to Lipschitz continuity in this context.

If the domain is a bornological space (for example, a pseudometrizable TVS, a Fréchet space, a normed space) then a linear operators into any other locally convex spaces is bounded if and only if it is continuous. For LF spaces, a weaker converse holds; any bounded linear map from an LF space is sequentially continuous.

If $F : X \to Y$ is a linear operator between two topological vector spaces and if there exists a neighborhood $U$ of the origin in $X$ such that $F(U)$ is a bounded subset of $Y,$ then $F$ is continuous. This fact is often summarized by saying that a linear operator that is bounded on some neighborhood of the origin is necessarily continuous. In particular, any linear functional that is bounded on some neighborhood of the origin is continuous (even if its domain is not a normed space).

==== Bornological spaces ====
Bornological spaces are exactly those locally convex spaces for which every bounded linear operator into another locally convex space is necessarily continuous. That is, a locally convex TVS $X$ is a bornological space if and only if for every locally convex TVS $Y,$ a linear operator $F : X \to Y$ is continuous if and only if it is bounded.

Every normed space is bornological.

=== Characterizations of bounded linear operators ===
Let $F : X \to Y$ be a linear operator between topological vector spaces (not necessarily Hausdorff). The following are equivalent:

1. $F$ is (locally) bounded;
2. (Definition): $F$ maps bounded subsets of its domain to bounded subsets of its codomain;
3. $F$ maps bounded subsets of its domain to bounded subsets of its image $\operatorname{Im} F := F(X)$;
4. $F$ maps every null sequence to a bounded sequence;
  - A null sequence is by definition a sequence that converges to the origin.
  - Thus any linear map that is sequentially continuous at the origin is necessarily a bounded linear map.
5. $F$ maps every Mackey convergent null sequence to a bounded subset of $Y.$ (Note: Proof: Assume for the sake of contradiction that $x_{\bull} = \left(x_i\right)_{i=1}^{\infty}$ converges to $0$ but $F\left(x_{\bull}\right) = \left(F\left(x_i\right)\right)_{i=1}^{\infty}$ is not bounded in $Y.$ Pick an open balanced neighborhood $V$ of the origin in $Y$ such that $V$ does not absorb the sequence $F\left(x_{\bull}\right).$ Replacing $x_{\bull}$ with a subsequence if necessary, it may be assumed without loss of generality that $F\left(x_i\right) \not\in i^2 V$ for every positive integer $i.$ The sequence $z_{\bull} := \left(x_i/i\right)_{i=1}^{\infty}$ is Mackey convergent to the origin (since $\left(i z_i\right)_{i=1}^{\infty} = \left(x_i\right)_{i=1}^{\infty} \to 0$ is bounded in $X$) so by assumption, $F\left(z_{\bull}\right) = \left(F\left(z_i\right)\right)_{i=1}^{\infty}$ is bounded in $Y.$ So pick a real $r > 1$ such that $F\left(z_i\right) \in r V$ for every integer $i.$ If $i > r$ is an integer then since $V$ is balanced, $F\left(x_i\right) \in r i V \subseteq i^2 V,$ which is a contradiction. Q.E.D. This proof readily generalizes to give even stronger characterizations of "$F$ is bounded." For example, the word "such that $\left(r_i x_i\right)_{i=1}^{\infty}$ is a bounded subset of $X.$" in the definition of "Mackey convergent to the origin" can be replaced with "such that $\left(r_i x_i\right)_{i=1}^{\infty} \to 0$ in $X.$")
  - A sequence $x_{\bull} = \left(x_i\right)_{i=1}^{\infty}$ is said to be Mackey convergent to the origin in $X$ if there exists a divergent sequence $r_{\bull} = \left(r_i\right)_{i=1}^{\infty} \to \infty$ of positive real number such that $r_{\bull} = \left(r_i x_i\right)_{i=1}^{\infty}$ is a bounded subset of $X.$

if $X$ and $Y$ are locally convex then the following may be add to this list:

6. $F$ maps bounded disks into bounded disks.
7. $F^{-1}$ maps bornivorous disks in $Y$ into bornivorous disks in $X.$

if $X$ is a bornological space and $Y$ is locally convex then the following may be added to this list:

8. $F$ is sequentially continuous at some (or equivalently, at every) point of its domain.
  - A sequentially continuous linear map between two TVSs is always bounded, but the converse requires additional assumptions to hold (such as the domain being bornological and the codomain being locally convex).
  - If the domain $X$ is also a sequential space, then $F$ is sequentially continuous if and only if it is continuous.
9. $F$ is sequentially continuous at the origin.

== Examples ==
- Any linear operator between two finite-dimensional normed spaces is bounded, and such an operator may be viewed as multiplication by some fixed matrix.
- Any linear operator defined on a finite-dimensional normed space is bounded.
- On the sequence space $c_{00}$ of eventually zero sequences of real numbers, considered with the $\ell^1$ norm, the linear operator to the real numbers which returns the sum of a sequence is bounded, with operator norm 1. If the same space is considered with the $\ell^{\infty}$ norm, the same operator is not bounded.
- Many integral transforms are bounded linear operators. For instance, if
  $$K : [a, b] \times [c, d] \to \R$$
  is a continuous function, then the operator $L$ defined on the space $C[a, b]$ of continuous functions on $[a, b]$ endowed with the uniform norm and with values in the space $C[c, d]$ with $L$ given by the formula
  $$(Lf)(y) = \int_a^b\!K(x, y)f(x)\,dx,$$
  is bounded. This operator is in fact a compact operator. The compact operators form an important class of bounded operators.
- The Laplace operator
  $$\Delta : H^2(\R^n) \to L^2(\R^n) \,$$
  (its domain is a Sobolev space and it takes values in a space of square-integrable functions) is bounded.
- The unilateral shift operator on the Lp space $\ell^2$ of all sequences $\left(x_0, x_1, x_2, \ldots\right)$ of real numbers with $x_0^2 + x_1^2 + x_2^2 + \cdots < \infty, \,$
  $$L(x_0, x_1, x_2, \dots) = \left(0, x_0, x_1, x_2, \ldots\right)$$
  is bounded. Its operator norm is easily seen to be $1.$

=== Unbounded linear operators ===
Let $X$ be the space of all trigonometric polynomials on $[-\pi, \pi],$ with the norm

$$\|P\| = \int_{-\pi}^{\pi}\!|P(x)|\,dx.$$

The operator $L : X \to X$ that maps a polynomial to its derivative is not bounded. Indeed, for $v_n = e^{i n x}$ with $n = 1, 2, \ldots,$ we have $\|v_n\| = 2\pi,$ while $\|L(v_n)\| = 2 \pi n \to \infty$ as $n \to \infty,$ so $L$ is not bounded.

=== Properties of the space of bounded linear operators ===
The space of all bounded linear operators from $X$ to $Y$ is denoted by $B(X, Y)$.

- $B(X, Y)$ is a normed vector space.
- If $Y$ is Banach, then so is $B(X, Y)$; in particular, dual spaces are Banach.
- For any $A \in B(X, Y)$ the kernel of $A$ is a closed linear subspace of $X$.
- If $B(X, Y)$ is Banach and $X$ is nontrivial, then $Y$ is Banach.

== See also ==
- Bounded set (topological vector space) – Generalization of boundedness
- Contraction (operator theory) – Bounded operators with sub-unit norm
- Discontinuous linear map
- Continuous linear operator – Function between topological vector spaces
- Local boundedness
- Norm (mathematics) – Length in a vector space
- Operator algebra – Branch of functional analysis
- Operator norm – Measure of the "size" of linear operators
- Operator theory – Mathematical study of linear operators
- Seminorm – Mathematical function
- Unbounded operator – Linear operator defined on a dense linear subspace

== Bibliography ==
- "Bounded operator", Encyclopedia of Mathematics, EMS Press, 2001 [1994]
- Kreyszig, Erwin: Introductory Functional Analysis with Applications, Wiley, 1989
- Narici, Lawrence; Beckenstein, Edward (2011). Topological Vector Spaces. Pure and applied mathematics (Second ed.). Boca Raton, FL: CRC Press. ISBN 978-1584888666. OCLC 144216834.
- Wilansky, Albert (2013). Modern Methods in Topological Vector Spaces. Mineola, New York: Dover Publications, Inc. ISBN 978-0-486-49353-4. OCLC 849801114.
