= Topologies on spaces of linear maps =

In mathematics, particularly functional analysis, spaces of linear maps between two vector spaces can be endowed with a variety of topologies. Studying space of linear maps and these topologies can give insight into the spaces themselves.

The article operator topologies discusses topologies on spaces of linear maps between normed spaces, whereas this article discusses topologies on such spaces in the more general setting of topological vector spaces (TVSs).

== Topologies of uniform convergence on arbitrary spaces of maps ==
Throughout, the following is assumed:

1. $T$ is any non-empty set and $\mathcal{G}$ is a non-empty collection of subsets of $T$ directed by subset inclusion (i.e. for any $G, H \in \mathcal{G}$ there exists some $K \in \mathcal{G}$ such that $G \cup H \subseteq K$).
2. $Y$ is a topological vector space (not necessarily Hausdorff or locally convex).
3. $\mathcal{N}$ is a basis of neighborhoods of 0 in $Y.$
4. $F$ is a vector subspace of $Y^T = \prod_{t \in T} Y,$ (Note: Because $T$ is just a set that is not yet assumed to be endowed with any vector space structure, $F \subseteq Y^T$ should not yet be assumed to consist of linear maps, which is a notation that currently can not be defined.) which denotes the set of all $Y$-valued functions $f : T \to Y$ with domain $T.$

=== 𝒢-topology ===
The following sets will constitute the basic open subsets of topologies on spaces of linear maps. For any subsets $G \subseteq T$ and $N \subseteq Y,$ let $\mathcal{U}(G, N) := \{f \in F : f(G) \subseteq N\}.$

The family $\{ \mathcal{U}(G, N) : G \in \mathcal{G}, N \in \mathcal{N} \}$ forms a neighborhood basis at the origin for a unique translation-invariant topology on $F,$ where this topology is not necessarily a vector topology (that is, it might not make $F$ into a TVS). This topology does not depend on the neighborhood basis $\mathcal{N}$ that was chosen and it is known as the topology of uniform convergence on the sets in $\mathcal{G}$ or as the $\mathcal{G}$-topology. However, this name is frequently changed according to the types of sets that make up $\mathcal{G}$ (e.g. the "topology of uniform convergence on compact sets" or the "topology of compact convergence", see the footnote for more details).

A subset $\mathcal{G}_1$ of $\mathcal{G}$ is said to be fundamental with respect to $\mathcal{G}$ if each $G \in \mathcal{G}$ is a subset of some element in $\mathcal{G}_1.$ In this case, the collection $\mathcal{G}$ can be replaced by $\mathcal{G}_1$ without changing the topology on $F.$ One may also replace $\mathcal{G}$ with the collection of all subsets of all finite unions of elements of $\mathcal{G}$ without changing the resulting $\mathcal{G}$-topology on $F.$

Call a subset $B$ of $T$ $F$-bounded if $f(B)$ is a bounded subset of $Y$ for every $f \in F.$

Theorem—The $\mathcal{G}$-topology on $F$ is compatible with the vector space structure of $F$ if and only if every $G \in \mathcal{G}$ is $F$-bounded; that is, if and only if for every $G \in \mathcal{G}$ and every $f \in F,$ $f(G)$ is bounded in $Y.$

Properties

Properties of the basic open sets will now be described, so assume that $G \in \mathcal{G}$ and $N \in \mathcal{N}.$ Then $\mathcal{U}(G, N)$ is an absorbing subset of $F$ if and only if for all $f \in F,$ $N$ absorbs $f(G)$. If $N$ is balanced (respectively, convex) then so is $\mathcal{U}(G, N).$

The equality $\mathcal{U}(\varnothing, N) = F$ always holds. If $s$ is a scalar then $s \mathcal{U}(G, N) = \mathcal{U}(G, s N),$ so that in particular, $- \mathcal{U}(G, N) = \mathcal{U}(G, - N).$ Moreover, $\mathcal{U}(G, N) - \mathcal{U}(G, N) \subseteq \mathcal{U}(G, N - N)$ and similarly $\mathcal{U}(G, M) + \mathcal{U}(G, N) \subseteq \mathcal{U}(G, M + N).$

For any subsets $G, H \subseteq X$ and any non-empty subsets $M, N \subseteq Y,$ $\mathcal{U}(G \cup H, M \cap N) \subseteq \mathcal{U}(G, M) \cap \mathcal{U}(H, N)$ which implies:

- if $M \subseteq N$ then $\mathcal{U}(G, M) \subseteq \mathcal{U}(G, N).$
- if $G \subseteq H$ then $\mathcal{U}(H, N) \subseteq \mathcal{U}(G, N).$
- For any $M, N \in \mathcal{N}$ and subsets $G, H, K$ of $T,$ if $G \cup H \subseteq K$ then $\mathcal{U}(K, M \cap N) \subseteq \mathcal{U}(G, M) \cap \mathcal{U}(H, N).$

For any family $\mathcal{S}$ of subsets of $T$ and any family $\mathcal{M}$ of neighborhoods of the origin in $Y,$ $\mathcal{U}\left(\bigcup_{S \in \mathcal{S}} S, N\right) = \bigcap_{S \in \mathcal{S}} \mathcal{U}(S, N) \qquad \text{ and } \qquad \mathcal{U}\left(G, \bigcap_{M \in \mathcal{M}} M\right) = \bigcap_{M \in \mathcal{M}} \mathcal{U}(G, M).$

=== Uniform structure ===
For any $G \subseteq T$ and $U \subseteq Y \times Y$ be any entourage of $Y$ (where $Y$ is endowed with its canonical uniformity), let $\mathcal{W}(G, U) ~:=~ \left\{(u, v) \in Y^T \times Y^T ~:~ (u(g), v(g)) \in U \; \text{ for every } g \in G\right\}.$ Given $G \subseteq T,$ the family of all sets $\mathcal{W}(G, U)$ as $U$ ranges over any fundamental system of entourages of $Y$ forms a fundamental system of entourages for a uniform structure on $Y^T$ called the uniformity of uniform converges on $G$ or simply the $G$-convergence uniform structure. The $\mathcal{G}$-convergence uniform structure is the least upper bound of all $G$-convergence uniform structures as $G \in \mathcal{G}$ ranges over $\mathcal{G}.$

Nets and uniform convergence

Let $f \in F$ and let $f_{\bull} = \left(f_i\right)_{i \in I}$ be a net in $F.$ Then for any subset $G$ of $T,$ say that $f_{\bull}$ converges uniformly to $f$ on $G$ if for every $N \in \mathcal{N}$ there exists some $i_0 \in I$ such that for every $i \in I$ satisfying $i \geq i_0,I$ $f_i - f \in \mathcal{U}(G, N)$ (or equivalently, $f_i(g) - f(g) \in N$ for every $g \in G$).

Theorem—If $f \in F$ and if $f_{\bull} = \left(f_i\right)_{i \in I}$ is a net in $F,$ then $f_{\bull} \to f$ in the $\mathcal{G}$-topology on $F$ if and only if for every $G \in \mathcal{G},$ $f_{\bull}$ converges uniformly to $f$ on $G.$

=== Inherited properties ===
Local convexity

If $Y$ is locally convex then so is the $\mathcal{G}$-topology on $F$ and if $\left(p_i\right)_{i \in I}$ is a family of continuous seminorms generating this topology on $Y$ then the $\mathcal{G}$-topology is induced by the following family of seminorms: $p_{G,i}(f) := \sup_{x \in G} p_i(f(x)),$ as $G$ varies over $\mathcal{G}$ and $i$ varies over $I$.

Hausdorffness

If $Y$ is Hausdorff and $T = \bigcup_{G \in \mathcal{G}} G$ then the $\mathcal{G}$-topology on $F$ is Hausdorff.

Suppose that $T$ is a topological space. If $Y$ is Hausdorff and $F$ is the vector subspace of $Y^T$ consisting of all continuous maps that are bounded on every $G \in \mathcal{G}$ and if $\bigcup_{G \in \mathcal{G}} G$ is dense in $T$ then the $\mathcal{G}$-topology on $F$ is Hausdorff.

Boundedness

A subset $H$ of $F$ is bounded in the $\mathcal{G}$-topology if and only if for every $G \in \mathcal{G},$ $H(G) = \bigcup_{h \in H} h(G)$ is bounded in $Y.$

=== Examples of 𝒢-topologies ===
Pointwise convergence

If we let $\mathcal{G}$ be the set of all finite subsets of $T$ then the $\mathcal{G}$-topology on $F$ is called the topology of pointwise convergence. The topology of pointwise convergence on $F$ is identical to the subspace topology that $F$ inherits from $Y^T$ when $Y^T$ is endowed with the usual product topology.

If $X$ is a non-trivial completely regular Hausdorff topological space and $C(X)$ is the space of all real (or complex) valued continuous functions on $X,$ the topology of pointwise convergence on $C(X)$ is metrizable if and only if $X$ is countable.

== 𝒢-topologies on spaces of continuous linear maps ==
Throughout this section we will assume that $X$ and $Y$ are topological vector spaces. $\mathcal{G}$ will be a non-empty collection of subsets of $X$ directed by inclusion. $L(X; Y)$ will denote the vector space of all continuous linear maps from $X$ into $Y.$ If $L(X; Y)$ is given the $\mathcal{G}$-topology inherited from $Y^X$ then this space with this topology is denoted by $L_{\mathcal{G}}(X; Y)$. The continuous dual space of a topological vector space $X$ over the field $\mathbb{F}$ (which we will assume to be real or complex numbers) is the vector space $L(X; \mathbb{F})$ and is denoted by $X^{\prime}$.

The $\mathcal{G}$-topology on $L(X; Y)$ is compatible with the vector space structure of $L(X; Y)$ if and only if for all $G \in \mathcal{G}$ and all $f \in L(X; Y)$ the set $f(G)$ is bounded in $Y,$ which we will assume to be the case for the rest of the article. Note in particular that this is the case if $\mathcal{G}$ consists of (von-Neumann) bounded subsets of $X.$

=== Assumptions on 𝒢 ===
Assumptions that guarantee a vector topology

- ($\mathcal{G}$ is directed): $\mathcal{G}$ will be a non-empty collection of subsets of $X$ directed by (subset) inclusion. That is, for any $G, H \in \mathcal{G},$ there exists $K \in \mathcal{G}$ such that $G \cup H \subseteq K$.

The above assumption guarantees that the collection of sets $\mathcal{U}(G, N)$ forms a filter base. The next assumption will guarantee that the sets $\mathcal{U}(G, N)$ are balanced. Every TVS has a neighborhood basis at 0 consisting of balanced sets so this assumption isn't burdensome.

- ($N \in \mathcal{N}$ are balanced): $\mathcal{N}$ is a neighborhoods basis of the origin in $Y$ that consists entirely of balanced sets.

The following assumption is very commonly made because it will guarantee that each set $\mathcal{U}(G, N)$ is absorbing in $L(X; Y).$

- ($G \in \mathcal{G}$ are bounded): $\mathcal{G}$ is assumed to consist entirely of bounded subsets of $X.$

The next theorem gives ways in which $\mathcal{G}$ can be modified without changing the resulting $\mathcal{G}$-topology on $Y.$

Theorem—Let $\mathcal{G}$ be a non-empty collection of bounded subsets of $X.$ Then the $\mathcal{G}$-topology on $L(X; Y)$ is not altered if $\mathcal{G}$ is replaced by any of the following collections of (also bounded) subsets of $X$:

1. all subsets of all finite unions of sets in $\mathcal{G}$;
2. all scalar multiples of all sets in $\mathcal{G}$;
3. all finite Minkowski sums of sets in $\mathcal{G}$;
4. the balanced hull of every set in $\mathcal{G}$;
5. the closure of every set in $\mathcal{G}$;

and if $X$ and $Y$ are locally convex, then we may add to this list:

6. the closed convex balanced hull of every set in $\mathcal{G}.$

Common assumptions

Some authors (e.g. Narici) require that $\mathcal{G}$ satisfy the following condition, which implies, in particular, that $\mathcal{G}$ is directed by subset inclusion:

$\mathcal{G}$ is assumed to be closed with respect to the formation of subsets of finite unions of sets in $\mathcal{G}$ (i.e. every subset of every finite union of sets in $\mathcal{G}$ belongs to $\mathcal{G}$).

Some authors (e.g. Trèves) require that $\mathcal{G}$ be directed under subset inclusion and that it satisfy the following condition:

If $G \in \mathcal{G}$ and $s$ is a scalar then there exists a $H \in \mathcal{G}$ such that $s G \subseteq H.$

If $\mathcal{G}$ is a bornology on $X,$ which is often the case, then these axioms are satisfied. If $\mathcal{G}$ is a saturated family of bounded subsets of $X$ then these axioms are also satisfied.

=== Properties ===
Hausdorffness

A subset of a TVS $X$ whose linear span is a dense subset of $X$ is said to be a total subset of $X.$ If $\mathcal{G}$ is a family of subsets of a TVS $T$ then $\mathcal{G}$ is said to be total in $T$ if the linear span of $\bigcup_{G \in \mathcal{G}} G$ is dense in $T.$

If $F$ is the vector subspace of $Y^T$ consisting of all continuous linear maps that are bounded on every $G \in \mathcal{G},$ then the $\mathcal{G}$-topology on $F$ is Hausdorff if $Y$ is Hausdorff and $\mathcal{G}$ is total in $T.$

Completeness

For the following theorems, suppose that $X$ is a topological vector space and $Y$ is a locally convex Hausdorff spaces and $\mathcal{G}$ is a collection of bounded subsets of $X$ that covers $X,$ is directed by subset inclusion, and satisfies the following condition: if $G \in \mathcal{G}$ and $s$ is a scalar then there exists a $H \in \mathcal{G}$ such that $s G \subseteq H.$

- $L_{\mathcal{G}}(X; Y)$ is complete if
  1. $X$ is locally convex and Hausdorff,
  2. $Y$ is complete, and
  3. whenever $u : X \to Y$ is a linear map then $u$ restricted to every set $G \in \mathcal{G}$ is continuous implies that $u$ is continuous,
- If $X$ is a Mackey space then $L_{\mathcal{G}}(X; Y)$ is complete if and only if both $X^{\prime}_{\mathcal{G}}$ and $Y$ are complete.
- If $X$ is barrelled then $L_{\mathcal{G}}(X; Y)$ is Hausdorff and quasi-complete.
- Let $X$ and $Y$ be TVSs with $Y$ quasi-complete and assume that (1) $X$ is barreled, or else (2) $X$ is a Baire space and $X$ and $Y$ are locally convex. If $\mathcal{G}$ covers $X$ then every closed equicontinuous subset of $L(X; Y)$ is complete in $L_{\mathcal{G}}(X; Y)$ and $L_{\mathcal{G}}(X; Y)$ is quasi-complete.
- Let $X$ be a bornological space, $Y$ a locally convex space, and $\mathcal{G}$ a family of bounded subsets of $X$ such that the range of every null sequence in $X$ is contained in some $G \in \mathcal{G}.$ If $Y$ is quasi-complete (respectively, complete) then so is $L_{\mathcal{G}}(X; Y)$.

Boundedness

Let $X$ and $Y$ be topological vector spaces and $H$ be a subset of $L(X; Y).$ Then the following are equivalent:

1. $H$ is bounded in $L_{\mathcal{G}}(X; Y)$;
2. For every $G \in \mathcal{G},$ $H(G) := \bigcup_{h \in H} h(G)$ is bounded in $Y$;
3. For every neighborhood $V$ of the origin in $Y$ the set $\bigcap_{h \in H} h^{-1}(V)$ absorbs every $G \in \mathcal{G}.$

If $\mathcal{G}$ is a collection of bounded subsets of $X$ whose union is total in $X$ then every equicontinuous subset of $L(X; Y)$ is bounded in the $\mathcal{G}$-topology. Furthermore, if $X$ and $Y$ are locally convex Hausdorff spaces then

- if $H$ is bounded in $L_{\sigma}(X; Y)$ (that is, pointwise bounded or simply bounded) then it is bounded in the topology of uniform convergence on the convex, balanced, bounded, complete subsets of $X.$
- if $X$ is quasi-complete (meaning that closed and bounded subsets are complete), then the bounded subsets of $L(X; Y)$ are identical for all $\mathcal{G}$-topologies where $\mathcal{G}$ is any family of bounded subsets of $X$ covering $X.$

=== Examples ===
$\mathcal{G} \subseteq \wp(X)$ ("topology of uniform convergence on ...")	Notation	Name ("topology of...")	Alternative name
finite subsets of $X$	$L_{\sigma}(X; Y)$	pointwise/simple convergence	topology of simple convergence
precompact subsets of $X$		precompact convergence	
compact convex subsets of $X$	$L_{\gamma}(X; Y)$	compact convex convergence	
compact subsets of $X$	$L_c(X; Y)$	compact convergence	
bounded subsets of $X$	$L_b(X; Y)$	bounded convergence	strong topology

==== The topology of pointwise convergence ====
By letting $\mathcal{G}$ be the set of all finite subsets of $X,$ $L(X; Y)$ will have the weak topology on $L(X; Y)$ or the topology of pointwise convergence or the topology of simple convergence and $L(X; Y)$ with this topology is denoted by $L_{\sigma}(X; Y)$. Unfortunately, this topology is also sometimes called the strong operator topology, which may lead to ambiguity; for this reason, this article will avoid referring to this topology by this name.

A subset of $L(X; Y)$ is called simply bounded or weakly bounded if it is bounded in $L_{\sigma}(X; Y)$.

The weak-topology on $L(X; Y)$ has the following properties:

- If $X$ is separable (that is, it has a countable dense subset) and if $Y$ is a metrizable topological vector space then every equicontinuous subset $H$ of $L_{\sigma}(X; Y)$ is metrizable; if in addition $Y$ is separable then so is $H.$
  - So in particular, on every equicontinuous subset of $L(X; Y),$ the topology of pointwise convergence is metrizable.
- Let $Y^X$ denote the space of all functions from $X$ into $Y.$ If $L(X; Y)$ is given the topology of pointwise convergence then space of all linear maps (continuous or not) $X$ into $Y$ is closed in $Y^X$.
  - In addition, $L(X; Y)$ is dense in the space of all linear maps (continuous or not) $X$ into $Y.$
- Suppose $X$ and $Y$ are locally convex. Any simply bounded subset of $L(X; Y)$ is bounded when $L(X; Y)$ has the topology of uniform convergence on convex, balanced, bounded, complete subsets of $X.$ If in addition $X$ is quasi-complete then the families of bounded subsets of $L(X; Y)$ are identical for all $\mathcal{G}$-topologies on $L(X; Y)$ such that $\mathcal{G}$ is a family of bounded sets covering $X.$

Equicontinuous subsets

- The weak-closure of an equicontinuous subset of $L(X; Y)$ is equicontinuous.
- If $Y$ is locally convex, then the convex balanced hull of an equicontinuous subset of $L(X; Y)$ is equicontinuous.
- Let $X$ and $Y$ be TVSs and assume that (1) $X$ is barreled, or else (2) $X$ is a Baire space and $X$ and $Y$ are locally convex. Then every simply bounded subset of $L(X; Y)$ is equicontinuous.
- On an equicontinuous subset $H$ of $L(X; Y),$ the following topologies are identical: (1) topology of pointwise convergence on a total subset of $X$; (2) the topology of pointwise convergence; (3) the topology of precompact convergence.

==== Compact convergence ====
By letting $\mathcal{G}$ be the set of all compact subsets of $X,$ $L(X; Y)$ will have the topology of compact convergence or the topology of uniform convergence on compact sets and $L(X; Y)$ with this topology is denoted by $L_c(X; Y)$.

The topology of compact convergence on $L(X; Y)$ has the following properties:

- If $X$ is a Fréchet space or a LF-space and if $Y$ is a complete locally convex Hausdorff space then $L_c(X; Y)$ is complete.
- On equicontinuous subsets of $L(X; Y),$ the following topologies coincide:
  - The topology of pointwise convergence on a dense subset of $X,$
  - The topology of pointwise convergence on $X,$
  - The topology of compact convergence.
  - The topology of precompact convergence.
- If $X$ is a Montel space and $Y$ is a topological vector space, then $L_c(X; Y)$ and $L_b(X; Y)$ have identical topologies.

==== Topology of bounded convergence ====
By letting $\mathcal{G}$ be the set of all bounded subsets of $X,$ $L(X; Y)$ will have the topology of bounded convergence on $X$ or the topology of uniform convergence on bounded sets and $L(X; Y)$ with this topology is denoted by $L_b(X; Y)$.

The topology of bounded convergence on $L(X; Y)$ has the following properties:

- If $X$ is a bornological space and if $Y$ is a complete locally convex Hausdorff space then $L_b(X; Y)$ is complete.
- If $X$ and $Y$ are both normed spaces then the topology on $L(X; Y)$ induced by the usual operator norm is identical to the topology on $L_b(X; Y)$.
  - In particular, if $X$ is a normed space then the usual norm topology on the continuous dual space $X^{\prime}$ is identical to the topology of bounded convergence on $X^{\prime}$.
- Every equicontinuous subset of $L(X; Y)$ is bounded in $L_b(X; Y)$.

== Polar topologies ==
Throughout, we assume that $X$ is a TVS.

=== 𝒢-topologies versus polar topologies ===
If $X$ is a TVS whose bounded subsets are exactly the same as its weakly bounded subsets (e.g. if $X$ is a Hausdorff locally convex space), then a $\mathcal{G}$-topology on $X^{\prime}$ (as defined in this article) is a polar topology and conversely, every polar topology if a $\mathcal{G}$-topology. Consequently, in this case the results mentioned in this article can be applied to polar topologies.

However, if $X$ is a TVS whose bounded subsets are not exactly the same as its weakly bounded subsets, then the notion of "bounded in $X$" is stronger than the notion of "$\sigma\left(X, X^{\prime}\right)$-bounded in $X$" (i.e. bounded in $X$ implies $\sigma\left(X, X^{\prime}\right)$-bounded in $X$) so that a $\mathcal{G}$-topology on $X^{\prime}$ (as defined in this article) is not necessarily a polar topology. One important difference is that polar topologies are always locally convex while $\mathcal{G}$-topologies need not be.

Polar topologies have stronger results than the more general topologies of uniform convergence described in this article and we refer the read to the main article: polar topology. We list here some of the most common polar topologies.

=== List of polar topologies ===
Suppose that $X$ is a TVS whose bounded subsets are the same as its weakly bounded subsets.

Notation: If $\Delta(Y, X)$ denotes a polar topology on $Y$ then $Y$ endowed with this topology will be denoted by $Y_{\Delta(Y, X)}$ or simply $Y_{\Delta}$ (e.g. for $\sigma(Y, X)$ we would have $\Delta = \sigma$ so that $Y_{\sigma(Y, X)}$ and $Y_{\sigma}$ all denote $Y$ with endowed with $\sigma(Y, X)$).

>$\mathcal{G} \subseteq \wp(X)$ ("topology of uniform convergence on ...")	Notation	Name ("topology of...")	Alternative name
finite subsets of $X$	$\sigma(Y, X)$ $s(Y, X)$	pointwise/simple convergence	weak/weak* topology
$\sigma(X, Y)$-compact disks	$\tau(Y, X)$		Mackey topology
$\sigma(X, Y)$-compact convex subsets	$\gamma(Y, X)$	compact convex convergence	
$\sigma(X, Y)$-compact subsets (or balanced $\sigma(X, Y)$-compact subsets)	$c(Y, X)$	compact convergence	
$\sigma(X, Y)$-bounded subsets	$b(Y, X)$ $\beta(Y, X)$	bounded convergence	strong topology

== 𝒢-ℋ topologies on spaces of bilinear maps ==
We will let $\mathcal{B}(X, Y; Z)$ denote the space of separately continuous bilinear maps and $B(X, Y; Z)$ denote the space of continuous bilinear maps, where $X, Y,$ and $Z$ are topological vector space over the same field (either the real or complex numbers). In an analogous way to how we placed a topology on $L(X; Y)$ we can place a topology on $\mathcal{B}(X, Y; Z)$ and $B(X, Y; Z)$.

Let $\mathcal{G}$ (respectively, $\mathcal{H}$) be a family of subsets of $X$ (respectively, $Y$) containing at least one non-empty set. Let $\mathcal{G} \times \mathcal{H}$ denote the collection of all sets $G \times H$ where $G \in \mathcal{G},$ $H \in \mathcal{H}.$ We can place on $Z^{X \times Y}$ the $\mathcal{G} \times \mathcal{H}$-topology, and consequently on any of its subsets, in particular on $B(X, Y; Z)$ and on $\mathcal{B}(X, Y; Z)$. This topology is known as the $\mathcal{G}-\mathcal{H}$-topology or as the topology of uniform convergence on the products $G \times H$ of $\mathcal{G} \times \mathcal{H}$.

However, as before, this topology is not necessarily compatible with the vector space structure of $\mathcal{B}(X, Y; Z)$ or of $B(X, Y; Z)$ without the additional requirement that for all bilinear maps, $b$ in this space (that is, in $\mathcal{B}(X, Y; Z)$ or in $B(X, Y; Z)$) and for all $G \in \mathcal{G}$ and $H \in \mathcal{H},$ the set $b(G, H)$ is bounded in $X.$ If both $\mathcal{G}$ and $\mathcal{H}$ consist of bounded sets then this requirement is automatically satisfied if we are topologizing $B(X, Y; Z)$ but this may not be the case if we are trying to topologize $\mathcal{B}(X, Y; Z)$. The $\mathcal{G}-\mathcal{H}$-topology on $\mathcal{B}(X, Y; Z)$ will be compatible with the vector space structure of $\mathcal{B}(X, Y; Z)$ if both $\mathcal{G}$ and $\mathcal{H}$ consists of bounded sets and any of the following conditions hold:

- $X$ and $Y$ are barrelled spaces and $Z$ is locally convex.
- $X$ is a F-space, $Y$ is metrizable, and $Z$ is Hausdorff, in which case $\mathcal{B}(X, Y; Z) = B(X, Y; Z).$
- $X, Y,$ and $Z$ are the strong duals of reflexive Fréchet spaces.
- $X$ is normed and $Y$ and $Z$ the strong duals of reflexive Fréchet spaces.

=== The ε-topology ===
Suppose that $X, Y,$ and $Z$ are locally convex spaces and let $\mathcal{G}^{\prime}$ and $\mathcal{H}^{\prime}$ be the collections of equicontinuous subsets of $X^{\prime}$ and $X^{\prime}$, respectively. Then the $\mathcal{G}^{\prime}-\mathcal{H}^{\prime}$-topology on $\mathcal{B}\left(X^{\prime}_{b\left(X^{\prime}, X\right)}, Y^{\prime}_{b\left(X^{\prime}, X\right)}; Z\right)$ will be a topological vector space topology. This topology is called the ε-topology and $\mathcal{B}\left(X^{\prime}_{b\left(X^{\prime}, X\right)}, Y_{b\left(X^{\prime}, X\right)}; Z\right)$ with this topology it is denoted by $\mathcal{B}_{\epsilon}\left(X^{\prime}_{b\left(X^{\prime}, X\right)}, Y^{\prime}_{b\left(X^{\prime}, X\right)}; Z\right)$ or simply by $\mathcal{B}_{\epsilon}\left(X^{\prime}_{b}, Y^{\prime}_{b}; Z\right).$

Part of the importance of this vector space and this topology is that it contains many subspace, such as $\mathcal{B}\left(X^{\prime}_{\sigma\left(X^{\prime}, X\right)}, Y^{\prime}_{\sigma\left(X^{\prime}, X\right)}; Z\right),$ which we denote by $\mathcal{B}\left(X^{\prime}_{\sigma}, Y^{\prime}_{\sigma}; Z\right).$ When this subspace is given the subspace topology of $\mathcal{B}_{\epsilon}\left(X^{\prime}_{b}, Y^{\prime}_{b}; Z\right)$ it is denoted by $\mathcal{B}_{\epsilon}\left(X^{\prime}_{\sigma}, Y^{\prime}_{\sigma}; Z\right).$

In the instance where $Z$ is the field of these vector spaces, $\mathcal{B}\left(X^{\prime}_{\sigma}, Y^{\prime}_{\sigma}\right)$ is a tensor product of $X$ and $Y.$ In fact, if $X$ and $Y$ are locally convex Hausdorff spaces then $\mathcal{B}\left(X^{\prime}_{\sigma}, Y^{\prime}_{\sigma}\right)$ is vector space-isomorphic to $L\left(X^{\prime}_{\sigma\left(X^{\prime}, X\right)}; Y_{\sigma(Y^{\prime}, Y)}\right),$ which is in turn is equal to $L\left(X^{\prime}_{\tau\left(X^{\prime}, X\right)}; Y\right).$

These spaces have the following properties:

- If $X$ and $Y$ are locally convex Hausdorff spaces then $\mathcal{B}_{\varepsilon}\left(X^{\prime}_{\sigma}, Y^{\prime}_{\sigma}\right)$ is complete if and only if both $X$ and $Y$ are complete.
- If $X$ and $Y$ are both normed (respectively, both Banach) then so is $\mathcal{B}_{\epsilon}\left(X^{\prime}_{\sigma}, Y^{\prime}_{\sigma}\right)$

== See also ==
- Bornological space – Space where bounded operators are continuous
- Bounded linear operator – Linear transformation between topological vector spaces
- Dual system
- Dual topology
- List of topologies – List of concrete topologies and topological spaces
- Modes of convergence – Property of a sequence or series
- Operator norm – Measure of the "size" of linear operators
- Polar topology – Dual space topology of uniform convergence on some sub-collection of bounded subsets
- Strong dual space – Continuous dual space endowed with the topology of uniform convergence on bounded sets
- Topologies on the set of operators on a Hilbert space
- Uniform convergence – Mode of convergence of a function sequence
- Uniform space – Topological space with a notion of uniform properties
- Weak topology – Mathematical term
  - Vague topology

== Bibliography ==
- Grothendieck, Alexander (1973). Topological Vector Spaces. Translated by Chaljub, Orlando. New York: Gordon and Breach Science Publishers. ISBN 978-0-677-30020-7. OCLC 886098.
- Hogbe-Nlend, Henri (1977). Bornologies and Functional Analysis: Introductory Course on the Theory of Duality Topology-Bornology and its use in Functional Analysis. North-Holland Mathematics Studies. Vol. 26. Amsterdam New York New York: North Holland. ISBN 978-0-08-087137-0. MR 0500064. OCLC 316549583.
- Jarchow, Hans (1981). Locally convex spaces. Stuttgart: B.G. Teubner. ISBN 978-3-519-02224-4. OCLC 8210342.
- Khaleelulla, S. M. (1982). Counterexamples in Topological Vector Spaces. Lecture Notes in Mathematics. Vol. 936. Berlin, Heidelberg, New York: Springer-Verlag. ISBN 978-3-540-11565-6. OCLC 8588370.
- Narici, Lawrence; Beckenstein, Edward (2011). Topological Vector Spaces. Pure and applied mathematics (Second ed.). Boca Raton, FL: CRC Press. ISBN 978-1584888666. OCLC 144216834.
- Schaefer, Helmut H.; Wolff, Manfred P. (1999). Topological Vector Spaces. GTM. Vol. 8 (Second ed.). New York, NY: Springer New York Imprint Springer. ISBN 978-1-4612-7155-0. OCLC 840278135.
- Trèves, François (2006) [1967]. Topological Vector Spaces, Distributions and Kernels. Mineola, N.Y.: Dover Publications. ISBN 978-0-486-45352-1. OCLC 853623322.
