= Albert Wilansky =

Canadian-American mathematician (1921–2017)

Albert "Tommy" Wilansky (13 September 1921, St. John's, Newfoundland – 3 July 2017, Bethlehem, Pennsylvania) was a Canadian-American mathematician, known for introducing Smith numbers.

== Biography ==
Wilansky was educated as an undergraduate at Dalhousie University, where he received an M.A. in mathematics in 1944. From 1944 to 1947 he was a graduate student at Brown University. In 1947 he received his Ph.D. with advisor Clarence Raymond Adams and dissertation An application of Banach linear functionals to the theory of summability.

From 1948 until his official retirement in 1992, Wilansky was a faculty member of the mathematics department of Lehigh University.

He was the university’s Distinguished Professor of Mathematics for the final 14 years of his tenure. During his 44 years at Lehigh he was a Fulbright visiting professor several times, at universities in Reading (1972–1973), London (1973), Tel Aviv (1981), and Berne (1981). Outside of academia he was a consultant for the Frankford Arsenal for the year 1957–1958.

Wilansky did research in analysis, specializing in summability theory, linear topological spaces, Banach algebras, and functional analysis. He was the author of several books and the author or co-author of more than 80 articles. He lectured at over 50 different universities. In 1969 he received the Mathematical Association of America's Lester R. Ford Award for his 1968 article Spectral Decomposition of Matrices for High School Students. (The 1969 award was also given individually to 5 other mathematicians.)

Wilansky was married to his first wife from 1947 until her death in 1969. They had two daughters. He had three step-daughters from his second marriage.

He was a professional musician for a brief time as a young man and continued playing piano and clarinet and writing songs, often with his wives and daughters.

== Selected publications ==
=== Articles ===
- Wilansky, Albert (1949). "An application of Banach linear functionals to summability". Transactions of the American Mathematical Society. 67 (1): 59–68. doi:10.1090/S0002-9947-1949-0032025-7. ISSN 0002-9947.
- —— (1949). "A necessary and sufficient condition that a summability method be stronger than convergence". Bulletin of the American Mathematical Society. 55 (10): 914–916. doi:10.1090/S0002-9904-1949-09307-2. ISSN 0002-9904.
- ——; Zeller, Karl (1955). "Summation of bounded divergent sequences, topological methods". Transactions of the American Mathematical Society. 78 (2): 501–509. doi:10.1090/S0002-9947-1955-0067220-7. ISSN 0002-9947.
- ——; Zeller, Karl (1963). "A biorthogonal system which is not a Toeplitz basis". Bulletin of the American Mathematical Society. 69 (5): 725–726. doi:10.1090/S0002-9904-1963-11003-4. ISSN 0002-9904.
- —— (1976). "On a characterization of barrelled spaces". Proceedings of the American Mathematical Society. 57 (2): 375. doi:10.1090/S0002-9939-1976-0412761-2. ISSN 0002-9939.
- Kalton, Nigel; —— (1976). "Tauberian operators on Banach spaces". Proceedings of the American Mathematical Society. 57 (2): 251–255. doi:10.1090/S0002-9939-1976-0473896-1. ISSN 0002-9939.
- Saxon, Stephen A.; —— (1977). "The equivalence of some Banach space problems". Colloquium Mathematicum. 37 (2). Institute of Mathematics Polish Academy of Sciences: 217–226. doi:10.4064/cm-37-2-217-226.
- Snyder, A. K.; —— (1980). "The Mazur-Orlicz bounded consistency theorem". Proceedings of the American Mathematical Society. 80 (2): 374–376. doi:10.1090/S0002-9939-1980-0577777-5. ISSN 0002-9939.
- —— (1981). "Mazur spaces". International Journal of Mathematics and Mathematical Sciences. 4: 39–53. doi:10.1155/S0161171281000021.

=== Books ===
- Functional analysis. New York: Blaisdell. 1964.
- Topics in functional analysis. Springer-Verlag. 1967; notes by W. D. Laverell Wilansky, Albert (14 November 2006). 2006 pbk edition. Springer. ISBN 978-3-540-35525-0.
- Topology for analysis. Waltham, Massachusetts: Ginn. 1970. Wilansky, Albert (2008). Dover reprint. Courier Corporation. ISBN 9780486469034.
- Modern methods in topological vector spaces. New York: McGraw-Hill. 1978. Wilansky, Albert (2013). Dover reprint. Courier Corporation. ISBN 9780486493534.
- Summability through functional analysis. North-Holland. 1984. Wilansky, A. (April 2000). 2000 pbk edition. Elsevier. ISBN 9780080871967.
