= Spaces of test functions and distributions =

Topological vector spaces

In mathematical analysis, the spaces of test functions and distributions are topological vector spaces (TVSs) that are used in the definition and application of distributions. Test functions are usually infinitely differentiable complex-valued (or sometimes real-valued) functions on a non-empty open subset $U \subseteq \R^n$ that have compact support. The space of all test functions, denoted by $C^\infty_\text{c}(U)$, is endowed with a certain topology, called the canonical LF-topology, that makes $C^\infty_\text{c}(U)$ into a complete Hausdorff locally convex TVS. The strong dual space of $C^\infty_\text{c}(U)$ is called the space of distributions on $U$ and is denoted by $\mathcal{D}^{\prime}(U) := \left(C^\infty_\text{c}(U)\right)^{\prime}_b,$ where the "$b$" subscript indicates that the continuous dual space of $C^\infty_\text{c}(U),$ denoted by $\left(C^\infty_\text{c}(U)\right)^{\prime},$ is endowed with the strong dual topology.

There are other possible choices for the space of test functions, which lead to other different spaces of distributions. If $U = \R^n$ then the use of Schwartz functions (Note: The Schwartz space consists of smooth rapidly decreasing test functions, where "rapidly decreasing" means that the function decreases faster than any polynomial increases as points in its domain move away from the origin.) as test functions gives rise to a certain subspace of $\mathcal{D}^{\prime}(U)$ whose elements are called tempered distributions. These are important because they allow the Fourier transform to be extended from "standard functions" to tempered distributions. The set of tempered distributions forms a vector subspace of the space of distributions $\mathcal{D}^{\prime}(U)$ and is thus one example of a space of distributions; there are many other spaces of distributions.

There also exist other major classes of test functions that are not subsets of $C_\text{c}^\infty(U)$, such as spaces of analytic test functions, which produce very different classes of distributions. The theory of such distributions has a different character from the previous one because there are no analytic functions with non-empty compact support. (Note: Except for the trivial (i.e. identically $0$) map, which of course is always analytic.) Use of analytic test functions leads to Sato's theory of hyperfunctions.

== Notation ==
The following notation will be used throughout this article:

- $n$ is a fixed positive integer and $U$ is a fixed non-empty open subset of Euclidean space $\R^{n}.$
- $\N = \{0, 1, 2, \ldots\}$ denotes the natural numbers.
- $k$ will denote a non-negative integer or $\infty.$
- If $f$ is a function then $\operatorname{Dom}(f)$ will denote its domain and the support of $f,$ denoted by $\operatorname{supp}(f),$ is defined to be the closure of the set $\{x \in \operatorname{Dom}(f): f(x) \neq 0\}$ in $\operatorname{Dom}(f).$
- For two functions $f, g : U \to \Complex$, the following notation defines a canonical pairing:
  $$\langle f, g\rangle := \int_U f(x) g(x) \,dx.$$
- A multi-index of size $n$ is an element in $\N^n$ (given that $n$ is fixed, if the size of multi-indices is omitted then the size should be assumed to be $n$). The length of a multi-index $\alpha = (\alpha_1, \ldots, \alpha_n) \in \N^n$ is defined as $\alpha_1+\cdots+\alpha_n$ and denoted by $|\alpha|.$ Multi-indices are particularly useful when dealing with functions of several variables, in particular we introduce the following notations for a given multi-index $\alpha = (\alpha_1, \ldots, \alpha_n) \in \N^n$:
  $$\begin{align}
x^\alpha &= x_1^{\alpha_1} \cdots x_n^{\alpha_n} \\
\partial^\alpha &= \frac{\partial^{|\alpha|}}{\partial x_1^{\alpha_1}\cdots \partial x_n^{\alpha_n}}
\end{align}$$
  We also introduce a partial order of all multi-indices by $\beta \geq \alpha$ if and only if $\beta_i \geq \alpha_i$ for all $1 \leq i\leq n.$ When $\beta \geq \alpha$ we define their multi-index binomial coefficient as:
  $$\binom{\beta}{\alpha} := \binom{\beta_1}{\alpha_1} \cdots \binom{\beta_n}{\alpha_n}.$$
- $\mathbb{K}$ will denote a certain non-empty collection of compact subsets of $U$ (described in detail below).

== Definitions of test functions and distributions ==
In this section, we will formally define real-valued distributions on U. With minor modifications, one can also define complex-valued distributions, and one can replace $\R^n$ with any (paracompact) smooth manifold.

Notation:
1. Let $k \in \{0, 1, 2, \ldots, \infty\}.$
2. Let $C^k(U)$ denote the vector space of all k-times continuously differentiable real or complex-valued functions on U.
3. For any compact subset $K \subseteq U,$ let $C^k(K)$ and $C^k(K;U)$ both denote the vector space of all those functions $f \in C^k(U)$ such that $\operatorname{supp}(f) \subseteq K$.
  - If $f \in C^k(K)$ then the domain of $f$ is U and not K. So although $C^k(K)$ depends on both K and U, only K is typically indicated. The justification for this common practice is detailed below. The notation $C^k(K;U)$ will only be used when the notation $C^k(K)$ risks being ambiguous.
  - Every $C^k(K)$ contains the constant 0 map, even if $K = \varnothing.$
4. Let $C_\text{c}^k(U)$ denote the set of all $f \in C^k(U)$ such that $f \in C^k(K)$ for some compact subset K of U.
  - Equivalently, $C_\text{c}^k(U)$ is the set of all $f \in C^k(U)$ such that $f$ has compact support.
  - $C_\text{c}^k(U)$ is equal to the union of all $C^k(K)$ as $K$ ranges over $\mathbb{K}$.
  - If $f$ is a real-valued function on U, then $f$ is an element of $C_\text{c}^k(U)$ if and only if $f$ is a $C^k$ bump function. Every real-valued test function on $U$ is always also a complex-valued test function on $U.$

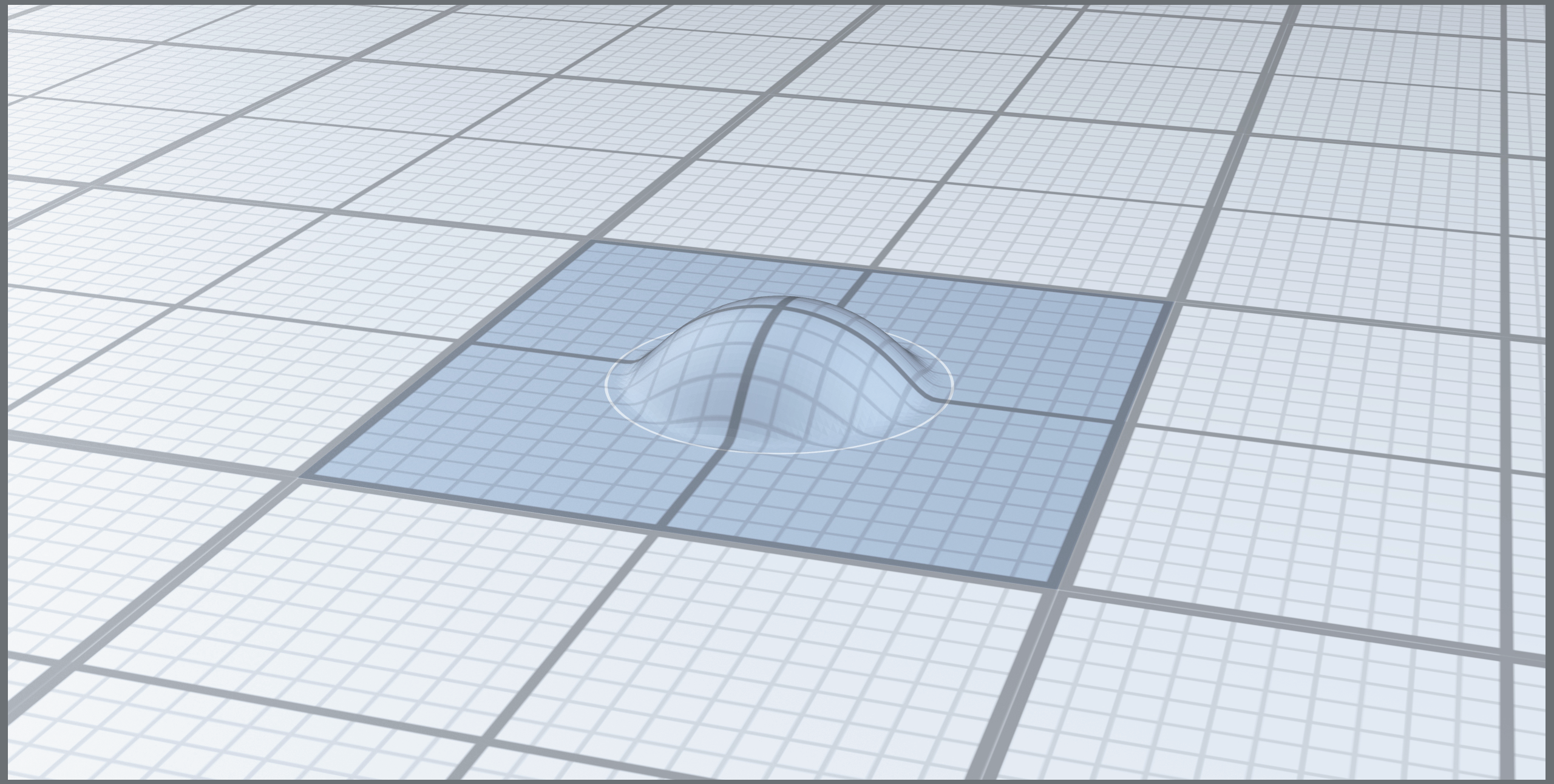
The graph of the bump function $(x,y) \in \mathbf{R}^2 \mapsto \Psi(r),$ where $r = (x^2 + y^2)^\frac{1}{2}$ and $\Psi(r) = e^{-\frac{1}{1 - r^2}}\cdot\mathbf{1}_{\{|r|<1\}}.$ This function is a test function on $\R^2$ and is an element of $C^\infty_\text{c}\left(\R^2\right).$ The support of this function is the closed unit disk in $\R^2.$ It is non-zero on the open unit disk and it is equal to 0 everywhere outside of it.

Note that for all $j, k \in \{0, 1, 2, \ldots, \infty\}$ and any compact subsets K and L of U, we have:
$$\begin{align}
C^k(K) &\subseteq C^k_\text{c}(U) \subseteq C^k(U) \\
C^k(K) &\subseteq C^k(L) && \text{ if } K \subseteq L \\
C^k(K) &\subseteq C^j(K) && \text{ if } j \leq k \\
C_\text{c}^k(U) &\subseteq C^j_\text{c}(U) && \text{ if } j \leq k \\
C^k(U) &\subseteq C^j(U) && \text{ if } j \leq k \\
\end{align}$$

Definition: Elements of $C_\text{c}^\infty(U)$ are called test functions on U and $C_\text{c}^\infty(U)$ is called the space of test functions on U. We will use both $\mathcal{D}(U)$ and $C_\text{c}^\infty(U)$ to denote this space.

Distributions on U are defined to be the continuous linear functionals on $C_\text{c}^\infty(U)$ when this vector space is endowed with a particular topology called the canonical LF-topology. This topology is unfortunately not easy to define but it is nevertheless still possible to characterize distributions in a way so that no mention of the canonical LF-topology is made.

Proposition: If T is a linear functional on $C_\text{c}^\infty(U)$ then the T is a distribution if and only if the following equivalent conditions are satisfied:

1. For every compact subset $K\subseteq U$ there exist constants $C>0$ and $N\in \N$ (dependent on $K$) such that for all $f \in C^\infty(K),$
  $$|T(f)| \leq C \sup \{|\partial^\alpha f(x)|: x \in U, |\alpha| \leq N\}.$$
2. For every compact subset $K\subseteq U$ there exist constants $C>0$ and $N\in \N$ such that for all $f \in C_\text{c}^\infty(U)$ with support contained in $K,$
  $$|T(f)| \leq C \sup \{|\partial^\alpha f(x)| : x \in K, |\alpha|\leq N\}.$$
3. For any compact subset $K\subseteq U$ and any sequence $\{f_i\}_{i=1}^\infty$ in $C^\infty(K),$ if $\{\partial^\alpha f_i\}_{i=1}^\infty$ converges uniformly to zero on $K$ for all multi-indices $\alpha$, then $T(f_i) \to 0.$

The above characterizations can be used to determine whether or not a linear functional is a distribution, but more advanced uses of distributions and test functions (such as applications to differential equations) is limited if no topologies are placed on $C_\text{c}^\infty(U)$ and $\mathcal{D}(U)$. To define the space of distributions we must first define the canonical LF-topology, which in turn requires that several other locally convex topological vector spaces (TVSs) be defined first. First, a (non-normable) topology on $C^\infty(U)$ will be defined, then every $C^\infty(K)$ will be endowed with the subspace topology induced on it by $C^\infty(U)$, and finally the (non-metrizable) canonical LF-topology on $C_\text{c}^\infty(U)$ will be defined. The space of distributions, being defined as the continuous dual space of $C_\text{c}^\infty(U)$, is then endowed with the (non-metrizable) strong dual topology induced by $C_\text{c}^\infty(U)$ and the canonical LF-topology (this topology is a generalization of the usual operator norm induced topology that is placed on the continuous dual spaces of normed spaces). This finally permits consideration of more advanced notions such as convergence of distributions (both sequences and nets), various (sub)spaces of distributions, and operations on distributions, including extending differential equations to distributions.

=== Choice of compact sets K ===
Throughout, $\mathbb{K}$ will be any collection of compact subsets of $U$ such that (1) $U = \bigcup_{K \in \mathbb{K}} K,$ and (2) for any compact $K_1,K_2 \subseteq U$ there exists some $K \in \mathbb{K}$ such that $K_1\cup K_2 \subseteq K.$ The most common choices for $\mathbb{K}$ are:

- The set of all compact subsets of $U$, or
- A set $\left\{\overline{U}_1, \overline{U}_2, \ldots \right\}$ where $U = \bigcup_{i=1}^\infty U_i,$ and for all i, $\overline{U}_i \subseteq U_{i+1}$ and $U_i$ is a relatively compact non-empty open subset of $U$ (here, "relatively compact" means that the closure of $U_i$, in either U or $\R^n$, is compact).

We make $\mathbb{K}$ into a directed set by defining $K_1 \leq K_2$ if and only if $K_1 \subseteq K_2.$ Note that although the definitions of the subsequently defined topologies explicitly reference $\mathbb{K}$, in reality they do not depend on the choice of $\mathbb{K};$ that is, if $\mathbb{K}_1$ and $\mathbb{K}_2$ are any two such collections of compact subsets of $U,$ then the topologies defined on $C^k(U)$ and $C_\text{c}^k(U)$ by using $\mathbb{K}_1$ in place of $\mathbb{K}$ are the same as those defined by using $\mathbb{K}_2$ in place of $\mathbb{K}.$

=== Topology on C^{k}(U) ===
We now introduce the seminorms that will define the topology on $C^k(U).$ Different authors sometimes use different families of seminorms so we list the most common families below. However, the resulting topology is the same no matter which family is used.

Suppose $k \in \{0, 1, 2, \ldots, \infty\}$ and $K$ is an arbitrary compact subset of $U.$ Suppose $i$ an integer such that $0 \leq i \leq k$ (Note: Note that $i$ being an integer implies $i \neq \infty.$ This is sometimes expressed as $0 \leq i < k + 1.$ Since $\infty + 1 = \infty,$ the inequality "$0 \leq i < k + 1$" means: $0 \leq i < \infty$ if $k = \infty,$ while if $k \neq \infty$ then it means $0 \leq i \leq k.$) and $p$ is a multi-index with length $| p|\leq k.$ For $K \neq \varnothing,$ define:

$$\begin{alignat}{4}
\text{ (1) }\ & s_{p,K}(f) &&:= \sup_{x_0 \in K} \left| \partial^p f(x_0) \right| \\[4pt]
\text{ (2) }\ & r_{i,K}(f) &&:= \sup_{\stackrel{|p| \leq i}{x_0 \in K}}  \left| \partial^p f(x_0) \right| = \sup_{|p| \leq i} \left(s_{p, K}(f)\right) \\[4pt]
\text{ (3) }\ & t_{i,K}(f) &&:= \sup_{x_0 \in K} \left(\sum_{|p| \leq i} \left| \partial^p f(x_0) \right|\right)
\end{alignat}$$

while for $K = \varnothing,$ define all the functions above to be the constant 0 map.

All of the functions above are non-negative $\R$-valued (Note: The image of the compact set $K$ under a continuous $\R$-valued map (for example, $x \mapsto \left|\partial^p f(x)\right|$ for $x \in U$) is itself a compact, and thus bounded, subset of $\R.$ If $K \neq \varnothing$ then this implies that each of the functions defined above is $\R$-valued (that is, none of the supremums above are ever equal to $\infty$).) seminorms on $C^k(U).$ As explained in this article, every set of seminorms on a vector space induces a locally convex vector topology.

Each of the following sets of seminorms
$$\begin{alignat}{4}
A ~:= \quad &\{r_{i,K} &&: \;K \text{ compact and } \;&&i \in \N \text{ satisfies } \;&&0 \leq i \leq k\} \\
B ~:= \quad &\{t_{i,K} &&: \;K \text{ compact and } \;&&i \in \N \text{ satisfies } \;&&0 \leq i \leq k\} \\
C ~:= \quad &\{s_{p,K} &&: \;K \text{ compact and } \;&&p \in \N^n \text{ satisfies } \;&&|p| \leq k\}
\end{alignat}$$
generate the same locally convex vector topology on $C^k(U)$.

The vector space $C^k(U)$ is endowed with the locally convex topology induced by any one of the four families $A, B, C$ of seminorms described above.

With this topology, $C^k(U)$ becomes a locally convex Fréchet space that is not normable. Every element of $A \cup B \cup C$ is a continuous seminorm on $C^k(U)$. Under this topology, a net $(f_i)_{i\in I}$ in $C^k(U)$ converges to $f \in C^k(U)$ if and only if for every multi-index $p$ with $|p|< k + 1$ and every compact $K$, the net of partial derivatives $\left(\partial^p f_i\right)_{i \in I}$ converges uniformly to $\partial^p f$ on $K.$ For any $k \in \{0, 1, 2, \ldots, \infty\},$ any (von Neumann) bounded subset of $C^{k+1}(U)$ is a relatively compact subset of $C^k(U).$ In particular, a subset of $C^\infty(U)$ is bounded if and only if it is bounded in $C^i(U)$ for all $i \in \N.$ The space $C^k(U)$ is a Montel space if and only if $k = \infty.$

The topology on $C^\infty(U)$ is the superior limit of the subspace topologies induced on $C^\infty(U)$ by the TVSs $C^i(U)$ as i ranges over the non-negative integers. A subset $W$ of $C^\infty(U)$ is open in this topology if and only if there exists $i\in \N$ such that $W$ is open when $C^\infty(U)$ is endowed with the subspace topology induced on it by $C^i(U)$.

==== Metric defining the topology ====
If the family of compact sets $\mathbb{K} = \left\{\overline{U}_1, \overline{U}_2, \ldots \right\}$ satisfies $U = \bigcup_{j=1}^\infty U_j$ and $\overline{U}_i \subseteq U_{i+1}$ for all $i,$ then a complete translation-invariant metric on $C^\infty(U)$ can be obtained by taking a suitable countable Fréchet combination of any one of the above defining families of seminorms (A, B, C). For example, using the seminorms $(r_{i,K_i})_{i=1}^\infty$ results in the metric
$$d(f, g) := \sum^\infty_{i=1} \frac{1}{2^i} \frac{r_{i, \overline{U}_i}(f - g)}{1 + r_{i, \overline{U}_i}(f - g)} = \sum^\infty_{i=1} \frac{1}{2^i} \frac{\sup_{|p| \leq i, x \in \overline{U}_i}  \left| \partial^p (f - g)(x) \right|}{\left[ 1 + \sup_{|p| \leq i, x \in \overline{U}_i}  \left| \partial^p (f - g)(x) \right| \right]}.$$

Often, it is easier to just consider seminorms (avoiding any metric) and use the tools of functional analysis.

=== Topology on C^{k}(K) ===
As before, fix $k \in \{0, 1, 2, \ldots, \infty\}.$ Recall that if $K$ is any compact subset of $U$ then $C^k(K) \subseteq C^k(U).$

Assumption: For any compact subset $K \subseteq U,$ we will henceforth assume that $C^k(K)$ is endowed with the subspace topology it inherits from the Fréchet space $C^k(U).$

For any compact subset $K \subseteq U,$ $C^k(K)$ is a closed subspace of the Fréchet space $C^k(U)$ and is thus also a Fréchet space. For all compact $K, L \subseteq U$ satisfying $K \subseteq L,$ denote the inclusion map by $\operatorname{In}_K^L : C^k(K) \to C^k(L).$ Then this map is a linear embedding of TVSs (that is, it is a linear map that is also a topological embedding) whose image (or "range") is closed in its codomain; said differently, the topology on $C^k(K)$ is identical to the subspace topology it inherits from $C^k(L),$ and also $C^k(K)$ is a closed subset of $C^k(L).$ The interior of $C^\infty(K)$ relative to $C^\infty(U)$ is empty.

If $k$ is finite then $C^k(K)$ is a Banach space with a topology that can be defined by the norm
$$r_K(f) := \sup_{|p|<k} \left(\sup_{x_0 \in K} \left| \partial^p f(x_0) \right|\right).$$

And when $k = 2,$ then $\,C^k(K)$ is even a Hilbert space. The space $C^\infty(K)$ is a distinguished Schwartz Montel space so if $C^\infty(K) \neq \{0\}$ then it is not normable and thus not a Banach space (although like all other $C^k(K),$ it is a Fréchet space).

==== Trivial extensions and independence of C^{k}(K)'s topology from U ====
The definition of $C^k(K)$ depends on U so we will let $C^k(K;U)$ denote the topological space $C^k(K),$ which by definition is a topological subspace of $C^k(U).$ Suppose $V$ is an open subset of $\R^n$ containing $U$ and for any compact subset $K \subseteq V$, let $C^k(K; V)$ is the vector subspace of $C^k(V)$ consisting of maps with support contained in $K.$ Given $f \in C_\text{c}^k(U)$, its trivial extension to V is by definition, the function $I(f) := F : V \to \Complex$ defined by:
$$F(x) = \begin{cases} f(x) & x \in U, \\ 0 & \text{otherwise}, \end{cases}$$
so that $F \in C^k(V).$ Let $I : C_\text{c}^k(U) \to C^k(V)$ denote the map that sends a function in $C_\text{c}^k(U)$ to its trivial extension on V. This map is a linear injection and for every compact subset $K \subseteq U$ (where $K$ is also a compact subset of $V$ since $K \subseteq U \subseteq V$) we have
$$\begin{alignat}{4}
I\left(C^k(K; U)\right) &~=~ C^k(K; V) \qquad \text{ and thus } \\
I\left(C_\text{c}^k(U)\right) &~\subseteq~ C_\text{c}^k(V)
\end{alignat}$$
If I is restricted to $C^k(K; U)$ then the following induced linear map is a homeomorphism (and thus a TVS-isomorphism):
$$\begin{alignat}{4}
\,& C^k(K; U) && \to \,&& C^k(K;V) \\
& f                  && \mapsto\,&& I(f) \\
\end{alignat}$$
and thus the next two maps (which like the previous map are defined by $f \mapsto I(f)$) are topological embeddings:
$$C^k(K; U) \to C^k(V), \qquad \text{ and } \qquad C^k(K; U) \to C_\text{c}^k(V),$$
(the topology on $C_\text{c}^k(V)$ is the canonical LF topology, which is defined later). Using the injection
$$I : C_\text{c}^k(U) \to C^k(V)$$
the vector space $C_\text{c}^k(U)$ is canonically identified with its image in $C_\text{c}^k(V) \subseteq C^k(V)$ (however, if $U \neq V$ then $I : C_\text{c}^\infty(U)\to C_\text{c}^\infty(V)$ is not a topological embedding when these spaces are endowed with their canonical LF topologies, although it is continuous). Because $C^k(K; U) \subseteq C_\text{c}^k(U)$, through this identification, $C^k(K; U)$ can also be considered as a subset of $C^k(V).$ Importantly, the subspace topology $C^k(K; U)$ inherits from $C^k(U)$ (when it is viewed as a subset of $C^k(U)$) is identical to the subspace topology that it inherits from $C^k(V)$ (when $C^k(K; U)$ is viewed instead as a subset of $C^k(V)$ via the identification). Thus the topology on $C^k(K;U)$ is independent of the open subset U of $\R^n$ that contains K. This justifies the practice of writing $C^k(K)$ instead of $C^k(K; U)$.

=== Canonical LF topology ===
Recall that $C_\text{c}^k(U)$ denote all those functions in $C^k(U)$ that have compact support in $U,$ where note that $C_\text{c}^k(U)$ is the union of all $C^k(K)$ as K ranges over $\mathbb{K}.$ Moreover, for every k, $C_\text{c}^k(U)$ is a dense subset of $C^k(U).$ The special case when $k = \infty$ gives us the space of test functions.

$C_\text{c}^\infty(U)$ is called the space of test functions on $U$ and it may also be denoted by $\mathcal{D}(U).$

This section defines the canonical LF topology as a direct limit. It is also possible to define this topology in terms of its neighborhoods of the origin, which is described afterwards.

==== Topology defined by direct limits ====
For any two sets K and L, we declare that $K \leq L$ if and only if $K \subseteq L$, which in particular makes the collection $\mathbb{K}$ of compact subsets of U into a directed set (we say that such a collection is directed by subset inclusion). For all compact $K, L \subseteq U$ satisfying $K \subseteq L,$ there are inclusion maps
$$\operatorname{In}_K^L : C^k(K) \to C^k(L)\quad \text{and} \quad \operatorname{In}_K^U : C^k(K) \to C_\text{c}^k(U).$$

Recall from above that the map $\operatorname{In}_K^L : C^k(K) \to C^k(L)$ is a topological embedding. The collection of maps
$$\left\{\operatorname{In}_K^L \;:\; K, L \in \mathbb{K} \;\text{ and }\; K \subseteq L \right\}$$
forms a direct system in the category of locally convex topological vector spaces that is directed by $\mathbb{K}$ (under subset inclusion). This system's direct limit (in the category of locally convex TVSs) is the pair $(C_\text{c}^k(U), \operatorname{In}_{\bullet}^U)$ where $\operatorname{In}_{\bullet}^U := \left(\operatorname{In}_K^U\right)_{K \in \mathbb{K}}$ are the natural inclusions and where $C_\text{c}^k(U)$ is now endowed with the (unique) strongest locally convex topology making all of the inclusion maps $\operatorname{In}_\bullet^U = (\operatorname{In}_K^U)_{K \in \mathbb{K}}$ continuous.

The canonical LF topology on $C_\text{c}^k(U)$ is the finest locally convex topology on $C_\text{c}^k(U)$ making all of the inclusion maps $\operatorname{In}_K^U : C^k(K) \to C_\text{c}^k(U)$ continuous (where K ranges over $\mathbb{K}$).
As is common in mathematics literature, the space $C_\text{c}^k(U)$ is henceforth assumed to be endowed with its canonical LF topology (unless explicitly stated otherwise).

==== Topology defined by neighborhoods of the origin ====
If $\cal U$ is a convex subset of $C_\text{c}^k(U)$, then $\cal U$ is a neighborhood of the origin in the canonical LF topology if and only if it satisfies the following condition:

For all $K \in \mathbb{K}$, ${\cal U}\cap C^k(K)$ is a neighborhood of the origin in $C^k(K)$.	CN

Note that any convex set satisfying this condition is necessarily absorbing in $C_\text{c}^k(U)$. Since the topology of any topological vector space is translation-invariant, any TVS-topology is completely determined by the set of neighborhood of the origin. This means that one could actually define the canonical LF topology by declaring that a convex balanced subset U is a neighborhood of the origin if and only if it satisfies condition CN.

==== Topology defined via differential operators ====
A linear differential operator in U with smooth coefficients is a sum
$$P := \sum_{\alpha \in \N^n} c_\alpha \partial^\alpha$$
where $c_\alpha \in C^\infty(U)$ and all but finitely many of $c_\alpha$ are identically 0. The integer $\sup \{|\alpha|: c_\alpha \neq 0\}$ is called the order of the differential operator $P.$ If $P$ is a linear differential operator of order k then it induces a canonical linear map $C^k(U) \to C^0(U)$ defined by $\phi \mapsto P\phi,$ where we shall reuse notation and also denote this map by $P.$

For any $1 \leq k \leq \infty,$ the canonical LF topology on $C_\text{c}^k(U)$ is the weakest locally convex TVS topology making all linear differential operators in $U$ of order $\,< k + 1$ into continuous maps from $C_\text{c}^k(U)$ into $C_\text{c}^0(U)$.

==== Properties of the canonical LF topology ====
===== Canonical LF topology's independence from K =====
One benefit of defining the canonical LF topology as the direct limit of a direct system is that we may immediately use the universal property of direct limits. Another benefit is that we can use well-known results from category theory to deduce that the canonical LF topology is actually independent of the particular choice of the directed collection $\mathbb{K}$ of compact sets. And by considering different collections $\mathbb{K}$ (in particular, those $\mathbb{K}$ mentioned at the beginning of this article), we may deduce different properties of this topology. In particular, we may deduce that the canonical LF topology makes $C_\text{c}^k(U)$ into a Hausdorff locally convex strict LF-space (and also a strict LB-space if $k \neq \infty$), which of course is the reason why this topology is called "the canonical LF topology" (see this footnote for more details). (Note: If we take $\mathbb{K}$ to be the set of all compact subsets of U then we can use the universal property of direct limits to conclude that the inclusion $\operatorname{In}_K^U : C^k(K) \to C_\text{c}^k(U)$ is a continuous and even that they are topological embedding for every compact subset $K \subseteq U.$ If however, we take $\mathbb{K}$ to be the set of closures of some countable increasing sequence of relatively compact open subsets of U having all of the properties mentioned earlier in this in this article then we immediately deduce that $C_\text{c}^k(U)$ is a Hausdorff locally convex strict LF-space (and even a strict LB-space when $k \neq \infty$). All of these facts can also be proved directly without using direct systems (although with more work).)

===== Universal property =====
From the universal property of direct limits, we know that if $u : C_\text{c}^k(U) \to Y$ is a linear map into a locally convex space Y (not necessarily Hausdorff), then u is continuous if and only if u is bounded if and only if for every $K \in \mathbb{K}$, the restriction of u to $C^k(K)$ is continuous (or bounded).

===== Dependence of the canonical LF topology on U =====
Suppose V is an open subset of $\R^n$ containing $U.$ Let $I : C_\text{c}^k(U)\to C_\text{c}^k(V)$ denote the map that sends a function in $C_\text{c}^k(U)$ to its trivial extension on V (which was defined above). This map is a continuous linear map. If (and only if) $U \neq V$ then $I\left(C_\text{c}^\infty(U)\right)$ is not a dense subset of $C_\text{c}^\infty(V)$ and $I : C_\text{c}^\infty(U)\to C_\text{c}^\infty(V)$ is not a topological embedding. Consequently, if $U \neq V$ then the transpose of $I : C_\text{c}^\infty(U)\to C_\text{c}^\infty(V)$ is neither one-to-one nor onto.

===== Bounded subsets =====
A subset $B \subseteq C_\text{c}^k(U)$ is bounded in $C_\text{c}^k(U)$ if and only if there exists some $K \in \mathbb{K}$ such that $B \subseteq C^k(K)$ and $B$ is a bounded subset of $C^k(K).$ Moreover, if $K \subseteq U$ is compact and $S \subseteq C^k(K)$ then $S$ is bounded in $C^k(K)$ if and only if it is bounded in $C^k(U).$ For any $0 \leq k \leq \infty,$ any bounded subset of $C_\text{c}^{k+1}(U)$ (resp. $C^{k+1}(U)$) is a relatively compact subset of $C_\text{c}^k(U)$ (resp. $C^k(U)$), where $\infty + 1 = \infty$.

===== Non-metrizability =====
For all compact $K \subseteq U$, the interior of $C^k(K)$ in $C_\text{c}^k(U)$ is empty so that $C_\text{c}^k(U)$ is of the first category in itself. It follows from Baire's theorem that $C_\text{c}^k(U)$ is not metrizable and thus also not normable (see this footnote (Note: For any TVS X (metrizable or otherwise), the notion of completeness depends entirely on a certain so-called "canonical uniformity" that is defined using only the subtraction operation (see the article Complete topological vector space for more details). In this way, the notion of a complete TVS does not require the existence of any metric. However, if the TVS X is metrizable and if $d$ is any translation-invariant metric on X that defines its topology, then X is complete as a TVS (i.e. it is a complete uniform space under its canonical uniformity) if and only if $(X, d)$ is a complete metric space. So if a TVS X happens to have a topology that can be defined by such a metric d then d may be used to deduce the completeness of X but the existence of such a metric is not necessary for defining completeness and it is even possible to deduce that a metrizable TVS is complete without ever even considering a metric (e.g. since the Cartesian product of any collection of complete TVSs is again a complete TVS, we can immediately deduce that the TVS $\R^\N,$ which happens to be metrizable, is a complete TVS; note that there was no need to consider any metric on $\R^\N$).) for an explanation of how the non-metrizable space $C_\text{c}^k(U)$ can be complete even though it does not admit a metric). The fact that $C_\text{c}^\infty(U)$ is a nuclear Montel space makes up for the non-metrizability of $C_\text{c}^\infty(U)$ (see this footnote for a more detailed explanation). (Note: One reason for giving $C_\text{c}^\infty(U)$ the canonical LF topology is because it is with this topology that $C_\text{c}^\infty(U)$ and its continuous dual space both become nuclear spaces, which have many nice properties and which may be viewed as a generalization of finite-dimensional spaces (for comparison, normed spaces are another generalization of finite-dimensional spaces that have many "nice" properties). In more detail, there are two classes of topological vector spaces (TVSs) that are particularly similar to finite-dimensional Euclidean spaces: the Banach spaces (especially Hilbert spaces) and the nuclear Montel spaces. Montel spaces are a class of TVSs in which every closed and bounded subset is compact (this generalizes the Heine–Borel theorem), which is a property that no infinite-dimensional Banach space can have; that is, no infinite-dimensional TVS can be both a Banach space and a Montel space. Also, no infinite-dimensional TVS can be both a Banach space and a nuclear space. All finite dimensional Euclidean spaces are nuclear Montel Hilbert spaces but once one enters infinite-dimensional space then these two classes separate. Nuclear spaces in particular have many of the "nice" properties of finite-dimensional TVSs (e.g. the Schwartz kernel theorem) that infinite-dimensional Banach spaces lack (for more details, see the properties, sufficient conditions, and characterizations given in the article Nuclear space). It is in this sense that nuclear spaces are an "alternative generalization" of finite-dimensional spaces. Also, as a general rule, in practice most "naturally occurring" TVSs are usually either Banach spaces or nuclear space. Typically, most TVSs that are associated with smoothness (i.e. infinite differentiability, such as $C_\text{c}^\infty(U)$ and $C^\infty(U)$) end up being nuclear TVSs while TVSs associated with finite continuous differentiability (such as $C^k(K)$ with K compact and $k \neq \infty$) often end up being non-nuclear spaces, such as Banach spaces.)

===== Relationships between spaces =====
Using the universal property of direct limits and the fact that the natural inclusions $\operatorname{In}_K^L : C^k(K) \to C^k(L)$ are all topological embedding, one may show that all of the maps $\operatorname{In}_K^U : C^k(K) \to C_\text{c}^k(U)$ are also topological embeddings. Said differently, the topology on $C^k(K)$ is identical to the subspace topology that it inherits from $C_\text{c}^k(U)$, where recall that $C^k(K)$'s topology was defined to be the subspace topology induced on it by $C^k(U)$. In particular, both $C_\text{c}^k(U)$ and $C^k(U)$ induces the same subspace topology on $C^k(K)$. However, this does not imply that the canonical LF topology on $C_\text{c}^k(U)$ is equal to the subspace topology induced on $C_\text{c}^k(U)$ by $C^k(U)$; these two topologies on $C_\text{c}^k(U)$ are in fact never equal to each other since the canonical LF topology is never metrizable while the subspace topology induced on it by $C^k(U)$ is metrizable (since recall that $C^k(U)$ is metrizable). The canonical LF topology on $C_\text{c}^k(U)$ is actually strictly finer than the subspace topology that it inherits from $C^k(U)$ (thus the natural inclusion $C_\text{c}^k(U)\to C^k(U)$ is continuous but not a topological embedding).

Indeed, the canonical LF topology is so fine that if $C_\text{c}^\infty(U)\to X$ denotes some linear map that is a "natural inclusion" (such as $C_\text{c}^\infty(U)\to C^k(U)$, or $C_\text{c}^\infty(U)\to L^p(U)$, or other maps discussed below) then this map will typically be continuous, which (as is explained below) is ultimately the reason why locally integrable functions, Radon measures, etc. all induce distributions (via the transpose of such a "natural inclusion"). Said differently, the reason why there are so many different ways of defining distributions from other spaces ultimately stems from how very fine the canonical LF topology is. Moreover, since distributions are just continuous linear functionals on $C_\text{c}^\infty(U)$, the fine nature of the canonical LF topology means that more linear functionals on $C_\text{c}^\infty(U)$ end up being continuous ("more" means as compared to a coarser topology that we could have placed on $C_\text{c}^\infty(U)$ such as for instance, the subspace topology induced by some $C^k(U)$, which although it would have made $C_\text{c}^\infty(U)$ metrizable, it would have also resulted in fewer linear functionals on $C_\text{c}^\infty(U)$ being continuous and thus there would have been fewer distributions; moreover, this particular coarser topology also has the disadvantage of not making $C_\text{c}^\infty(U)$ into a complete TVS).

===== Other properties =====
- The differentiation map $C_\text{c}^\infty(U) \to C_\text{c}^\infty(U)$ is a continuous linear operator.
- The bilinear multiplication map $C^\infty(\R^m) \times C_\text{c}^\infty(\R^n) \to C_\text{c}^\infty(\R^{m+n})$ given by $(f,g)\mapsto fg$ is not continuous; it is however, hypocontinuous.

=== Distributions ===
As discussed earlier, continuous linear functionals on a $C_\text{c}^\infty(U)$ are known as distributions on U. Thus the set of all distributions on U is the continuous dual space of $C_\text{c}^\infty(U)$, which when endowed with the strong dual topology is denoted by $\mathcal{D}^{\prime}(U)$.

By definition, a distribution on U is defined to be a continuous linear functional on $C_\text{c}^\infty(U)$. Said differently, a distribution on U is an element of the continuous dual space of $C_\text{c}^\infty(U)$ when $C_\text{c}^\infty(U)$ is endowed with its canonical LF topology.

We have the canonical duality pairing between a distribution T on U and a test function $f \in C_\text{c}^\infty(U)$, which is denoted using angle brackets by
$$\begin{cases} \mathcal{D}^{\prime}(U) \times C_\text{c}^\infty(U) \to \R \\ (T, f) \mapsto \langle T, f \rangle := T(f) \end{cases}$$

One interprets this notation as the distribution T acting on the test function $f$ to give a scalar, or symmetrically as the test function $f$ acting on the distribution T.

==== Characterizations of distributions ====
Proposition. If T is a linear functional on $C_\text{c}^\infty(U)$ then the following are equivalent:

1. T is a distribution;
2. Definition : T is a continuous function.
3. T is continuous at the origin.
4. T is uniformly continuous.
5. T is a bounded operator.
6. T is sequentially continuous.
  - explicitly, for every sequence $\left(f_i\right)_{i=1}^\infty$ in $C_\text{c}^\infty(U)$ that converges in $C_\text{c}^\infty(U)$ to some $f \in C_\text{c}^\infty(U),$ $\lim_{i \to \infty} T\left(f_i\right) = T(f);$ (Note: Even though the topology of $C_\text{c}^\infty(U)$ is not metrizable, a linear functional on $C_\text{c}^\infty(U)$ is continuous if and only if it is sequentially continuous.)
7. T is sequentially continuous at the origin; in other words, T maps null sequences (Note: A null sequence is a sequence that converges to the origin.) to null sequences.
  - explicitly, for every sequence $\left(f_i\right)_{i=1}^\infty$ in $C_\text{c}^\infty(U)$ that converges in $C_\text{c}^\infty(U)$ to the origin (such a sequence is called a null sequence), $\lim_{i \to \infty} T\left(f_i\right) = 0.$
  - a null sequence is by definition a sequence that converges to the origin.
8. T maps null sequences to bounded subsets.
  - explicitly, for every sequence $\left(f_i\right)_{i=1}^\infty$ in $C_\text{c}^\infty(U)$ that converges in $C_\text{c}^\infty(U)$ to the origin, the sequence $\left(T\left(f_i\right)\right)_{i=1}^\infty$ is bounded.
9. T maps Mackey convergent null sequences (Note: A sequence $x_{\bull} = \left(x_i\right)_{i=1}^\infty$ is said to be Mackey convergent to 0 in $X,$ if there exists a divergent sequence $r_{\bull} = \left(r_i\right)_{i=1}^\infty \to \infty$ of positive real number such that $\left(r_i x_i\right)_{i=1}^\infty$ is a bounded set in $X.$) to bounded subsets;
  - explicitly, for every Mackey convergent null sequence $\left(f_i\right)_{i=1}^\infty$ in $C_\text{c}^\infty(U)$, the sequence $\left(T\left(f_i\right)\right)_{i=1}^\infty$ is bounded.
  - a sequence $f_{\bull} = \left(f_i\right)_{i=1}^\infty$ is said to be Mackey convergent to 0 if there exists a divergent sequence $r_{\bull} = \left(r_i\right)_{i=1}^\infty \to \infty$ of positive real number such that the sequence $\left(r_i f_i\right)_{i=1}^\infty$ is bounded; every sequence that is Mackey convergent to 0 necessarily converges to the origin (in the usual sense).
10. The kernel of T is a closed subspace of $C_\text{c}^\infty(U)$.
11. The graph of T is closed.
12. There exists a continuous seminorm $g$ on $C_\text{c}^\infty(U)$ such that $|T| \leq g.$
13. There exists a constant $C > 0,$ a collection of continuous seminorms, $\mathcal{P},$ that defines the canonical LF topology of $C_\text{c}^\infty(U),$ and a finite subset $\left\{g_1, \ldots, g_m\right\} \subseteq \mathcal{P}$ such that $|T| \leq C(g_1 + \cdots g_m);$ (Note: If $\mathcal{P}$ is also a directed set under the usual function comparison then we can take the finite collection to consist of a single element.)
14. For every compact subset $K \subseteq U$ there exist constants $C > 0$ and $N \in \N$ such that for all $f \in C^\infty(K),$
  $$|T(f)| \leq C \sup \{|\partial^p f(x)| : x \in U, |\alpha|\leq N\}.$$
15. For every compact subset $K\subseteq U$ there exist constants $C_K>0$ and $N_K\in \N$ such that for all $f \in C_\text{c}^\infty(U)$ with support contained in $K,$
  $$|T(f)| \leq C_K \sup \{\left|\partial^\alpha f(x)\right| : x \in K, |\alpha|\leq N_K\}.$$
16. For any compact subset $K\subseteq U$ and any sequence $\{f_i\}_{i=1}^\infty$ in $C^\infty(K),$ if $\{\partial^p f_i\}_{i=1}^\infty$ converges uniformly to zero for all multi-indices $p,$ then $T(f_i) \to 0.$
17. Any of the three statements immediately above (that is, statements 14, 15, and 16) but with the additional requirement that compact set $K$ belongs to $\mathbb{K}.$

==== Topology on the space of distributions ====
Definition and notation: The space of distributions on U, denoted by $\mathcal{D}^{\prime}(U)$, is the continuous dual space of $C_\text{c}^\infty(U)$ endowed with the topology of uniform convergence on bounded subsets of $C_\text{c}^\infty(U).$ More succinctly, the space of distributions on U is ${{{1}}}$.

The topology of uniform convergence on bounded subsets is also called the strong dual topology. (Note: In functional analysis, the strong dual topology is often the "standard" or "default" topology placed on the continuous dual space $X',$ where if X is a normed space then this strong dual topology is the same as the usual norm-induced topology on $X'$.) This topology is chosen because it is with this topology that $\mathcal{D}^{\prime}(U)$ becomes a nuclear Montel space and it is with this topology that the Schwartz kernel theorem holds. No matter what dual topology is placed on $\mathcal{D}^{\prime}(U),$ (Note: Technically, the topology must be coarser than the strong dual topology and also simultaneously be finer than the weak* topology.) a sequence of distributions converges in this topology if and only if it converges pointwise (although this need not be true of a net). No matter which topology is chosen, $\mathcal{D}^{\prime}(U)$ will be a non-metrizable, locally convex topological vector space. The space $\mathcal{D}^{\prime}(U)$ is separable and has the strong Pytkeev property but it is neither a k-space nor a sequential space, which in particular implies that it is not metrizable and also that its topology can not be defined using only sequences.

=== Topological properties ===
==== Topological vector space categories ====
The canonical LF topology makes $C_\text{c}^k(U)$ into a complete distinguished strict LF-space (and a strict LB-space if and only if $k \neq \infty$), which implies that $C_\text{c}^k(U)$ is a meager subset of itself. Furthermore, $C_\text{c}^k(U)$, as well as its strong dual space, is a complete Hausdorff locally convex barrelled bornological Mackey space. The strong dual of $C_\text{c}^k(U)$ is a Fréchet space if and only if $k \neq \infty$ so in particular, the strong dual of $C_\text{c}^\infty(U)$, which is the space $\mathcal{D}^{\prime}(U)$ of distributions on U, is not metrizable (note that the weak-* topology on $\mathcal{D}^{\prime}(U)$ also is not metrizable and moreover, it further lacks almost all of the nice properties that the strong dual topology gives $\mathcal{D}^{\prime}(U)$).

The three spaces $C_\text{c}^\infty(U)$, $C^\infty(U)$, and the Schwartz space $\mathcal{S}(\R^n)$, as well as the strong duals of each of these three spaces, are complete nuclear Montel bornological spaces, which implies that all six of these locally convex spaces are also paracompact reflexive barrelled Mackey spaces. The spaces $C^\infty(U)$ and $\mathcal{S}(\R^n)$ are both distinguished Fréchet spaces. Moreover, both $C_\text{c}^\infty(U)$ and $\mathcal{S}(\R^n)$ are Schwartz TVSs.

==== Convergent sequences ====
===== Convergent sequences and their insufficiency to describe topologies =====
The strong dual spaces of $C^\infty(U)$ and $\mathcal{S}(\R^n)$ are sequential spaces but not Fréchet-Urysohn spaces. Moreover, neither the space of test functions $C_\text{c}^\infty(U)$ nor its strong dual $\mathcal{D}^{\prime}(U)$ is a sequential space (not even an Ascoli space), which in particular implies that their topologies can not be defined entirely in terms of convergent sequences.

A sequence $\left(f_i\right)_{i=1}^\infty$ in $C_\text{c}^k(U)$ converges in $C_\text{c}^k(U)$ if and only if there exists some $K \in \mathbb{K}$ such that $C^k(K)$ contains this sequence and this sequence converges in $C^k(K)$; equivalently, it converges if and only if the following two conditions hold:

1. There is a compact set $K \subseteq U$ containing the supports of all $f_i.$
2. For each multi-index $\alpha,$ the sequence of partial derivatives $\partial^\alpha f_{i}$ tends uniformly to $\partial^\alpha f.$

Neither the space $C_\text{c}^\infty(U)$ nor its strong dual $\mathcal{D}^{\prime}(U)$ is a sequential space, and consequently, their topologies can not be defined entirely in terms of convergent sequences. For this reason, the above characterization of when a sequence converges is not enough to define the canonical LF topology on $C_\text{c}^\infty(U)$. The same can be said of the strong dual topology on $\mathcal{D}^{\prime}(U)$.

===== What sequences do characterize =====
Nevertheless, sequences do characterize many important properties, as we now discuss. It is known that in the dual space of any Montel space, a sequence converges in the strong dual topology if and only if it converges in the weak* topology, which in particular, is the reason why a sequence of distributions converges (in the strong dual topology) if and only if it converges pointwise (this leads many authors to use pointwise convergence to actually define the convergence of a sequence of distributions; this is fine for sequences but it does not extend to the convergence of nets of distributions since a net may converge pointwise but fail to converge in the strong dual topology).

Sequences characterize continuity of linear maps valued in locally convex space. Suppose X is a locally convex bornological space (such as any of the six TVSs mentioned earlier). Then a linear map $F : X \to Y$ into a locally convex space Y is continuous if and only if it maps null sequences in X to bounded subsets of Y. (Note: Recall that a linear map is bounded if and only if it maps null sequences to bounded sequences.) More generally, such a linear map $F : X \to Y$ is continuous if and only if it maps Mackey convergent null sequences to bounded subsets of $Y.$ So in particular, if a linear map $F : X \to Y$ into a locally convex space is sequentially continuous at the origin then it is continuous. However, this does not necessarily extend to non-linear maps and/or to maps valued in topological spaces that are not locally convex TVSs.

For every $k \in \{0, 1, \ldots, \infty\}, C_\text{c}^\infty(U)$ is sequentially dense in $C_\text{c}^k(U)$. Furthermore, $\{D_\phi : \phi \in C_\text{c}^\infty(U)\}$ is a sequentially dense subset of $\mathcal{D}^{\prime}(U)$ (with its strong dual topology) and also a sequentially dense subset of the strong dual space of $C^\infty(U).$

===== Sequences of distributions =====
A sequence of distributions $(T_i)_{i=1}^\infty$ converges with respect to the weak-* topology on $\mathcal{D}^{\prime}(U)$ to a distribution T if and only if
$$\langle T_i, f \rangle \to \langle T, f \rangle$$
for every test function $f \in \mathcal{D}(U).$ For example, if $f_m:\R\to\R$ is the function
$$f_m(x) = \begin{cases} m & \text{ if } x \in [0,\frac{1}{m}] \\ 0 & \text{ otherwise } \end{cases}$$
and $T_m$ is the distribution corresponding to $f_m,$ then
$$\langle T_m, f \rangle = m \int_0^{\frac{1}{m}} f(x)\, dx \to f(0) = \langle \delta, f \rangle$$
as $m \to \infty,$ so $T_m \to \delta$ in $\mathcal{D}^{\prime}(\R).$ Thus, for large $m,$ the function $f_m$ can be regarded as an approximation of the Dirac delta distribution.

===== Other properties =====
- The strong dual space of $\mathcal{D}^{\prime}(U)$ is TVS isomorphic to $C_\text{c}^\infty(U)$ via the canonical TVS-isomorphism $C_\text{c}^\infty(U) \to (\mathcal{D}^{\prime}(U))'_{b}$ defined by sending $f \in C_\text{c}^\infty(U)$ to value at $f$ (that is, to the linear functional on $\mathcal{D}^{\prime}(U)$ defined by sending $d \in \mathcal{D}^{\prime}(U)$ to $d(f)$);
- On any bounded subset of $\mathcal{D}^{\prime}(U),$ the weak and strong subspace topologies coincide; the same is true for $C_\text{c}^\infty(U)$;
- Every weakly convergent sequence in $\mathcal{D}^{\prime}(U)$ is strongly convergent (although this does not extend to nets).

== Localization of distributions ==
=== Preliminaries: Transpose of a linear operator ===
Operations on distributions and spaces of distributions are often defined by means of the transpose of a linear operator. This is because the transpose allows for a unified presentation of the many definitions in the theory of distributions and also because its properties are well known in functional analysis. For instance, the well-known Hermitian adjoint of a linear operator between Hilbert spaces is just the operator's transpose (but with the Riesz representation theorem used to identify each Hilbert space with its continuous dual space). In general the transpose of a continuous linear map $A : X \to Y$ is the linear map
$${}^\text{t}\!A : Y' \to X' \qquad \text{ defined by } \qquad {}^\text{t}\! A(y') := y' \circ A,$$
or equivalently, it is the unique map satisfying $\langle y', A(x)\rangle = \left\langle {}^\text{t}\! A (y'), x \right\rangle$ for all $x \in X$ and all $y' \in Y'$ (the prime symbol in $y'$ does not denote a derivative of any kind; it merely indicates that $y'$ is an element of the continuous dual space $Y'$). Since $A$ is continuous, the transpose ${}^\text{t}\! A : Y' \to X'$ is also continuous when both duals are endowed with their respective strong dual topologies; it is also continuous when both duals are endowed with their respective weak* topologies (see the articles polar topology and dual system for more details).

In the context of distributions, the characterization of the transpose can be refined slightly. Let $A : \mathcal{D}(U) \to \mathcal{D}(U)$ be a continuous linear map. Then by definition, the transpose of $A$ is the unique linear operator $A^t : \mathcal{D}'(U) \to \mathcal{D}'(U)$ that satisfies:
$$\langle {}^\text{t}\! A(T), \phi \rangle = \langle T, A(\phi) \rangle \quad \text{ for all } \phi \in \mathcal{D}(U) \text{ and all } T \in \mathcal{D}'(U).$$

Since $\mathcal{D}(U)$ is dense in $\mathcal{D}'(U)$ (here, $\mathcal{D}(U)$ actually refers to the set of distributions $\left\{D_\psi : \psi \in \mathcal{D}(U)\right\}$) it is sufficient that the defining equality hold for all distributions of the form $T = D_\psi$ where $\psi \in \mathcal{D}(U).$ Explicitly, this means that a continuous linear map $B : \mathcal{D}'(U) \to \mathcal{D}'(U)$ is equal to ${}^\text{t}\! A$ if and only if the condition below holds:
$$\langle B(D_\psi), \phi \rangle = \langle {}^\text{t}\! A(D_\psi), \phi \rangle \quad \text{ for all } \phi, \psi \in \mathcal{D}(U)$$
where the right hand side equals $\langle {}^\text{t}\! A(D_\psi), \phi \rangle = \langle D_\psi, A(\phi) \rangle = \langle \psi, A(\phi) \rangle = \int_U \psi \cdot A(\phi) \,dx.$

=== Extensions and restrictions to an open subset ===
Let $V \subseteq U$ be open subsets of $\R^n$. Every function $f \in \mathcal{D}(V)$ can be extended by zero from its domain $V$ to a function on $U$ by setting it equal to $0$ on the complement $U \setminus V.$ This extension is a smooth compactly supported function called the trivial extension of $f$ to $U$ and it will be denoted by $E_{VU} (f)$. This assignment $f \mapsto E_{VU} (f)$ defines the trivial extension operator $E_{VU} : \mathcal{D}(V) \to \mathcal{D}(U),$ which is a continuous injective linear map. It is used to canonically identify $\mathcal{D}(V)$ as a vector subspace of $\mathcal{D}(U)$ (although not as a topological subspace). Its transpose (explained here)
$$\rho_{VU} := {}^\text{t}\! E_{VU} : \mathcal{D}'(U) \to \mathcal{D}'(V),$$
is called the restriction to $V$ of distributions in $U$ and as the name suggests, the image $\rho_{VU}(T)$ of a distribution $T \in \mathcal{D}'(U)$ under this map is a distribution on $V$ called the restriction of $T$ to $V.$ The defining condition of the restriction $\rho_{VU}(T)$ is:
$$\langle \rho_{VU} T, \phi \rangle = \langle T, E_{VU} \phi \rangle \quad \text{ for all } \phi \in \mathcal{D}(V).$$
If $V \neq U$ then the (continuous injective linear) trivial extension map $E_{VU} : \mathcal{D}(V) \to \mathcal{D}(U)$ is not a topological embedding (in other words, if this linear injection was used to identify $\mathcal{D}(V)$ as a subset of $\mathcal{D}(U)$ then $\mathcal{D}(V)$'s topology would strictly finer than the subspace topology that $\mathcal{D}(U)$ induces on it; importantly, it would not be a topological subspace since that requires equality of topologies) and its range is also not dense in its codomain $\mathcal{D}(U).$ Consequently, if $V \neq U$ then the restriction mapping is neither injective nor surjective. A distribution $S \in \mathcal{D}'(V)$ is said to be extendible to U if it belongs to the range of the transpose of $E_{VU}$ and it is called extendible if it is extendable to $\R^n.$

Unless $U = V$, the restriction to $V$ is neither injective nor surjective.

== Spaces of distributions ==
For all $0 < k < \infty$ and all $1 < p < \infty$, all of the following canonical injections are continuous and have an image/range that is a dense subset of their codomain:
$$\begin{matrix}
C_\text{c}^\infty(U) & \to & C_\text{c}^k(U) & \to & C_\text{c}^0(U) & \to & L_\text{c}^\infty(U) & \to & L_\text{c}^{p+1}(U) & \to & L_\text{c}^p(U) & \to & L_\text{c}^1(U) \\
\downarrow & &\downarrow && \downarrow && && &&  && && \\
C^\infty(U) & \to & C^k(U) & \to & C^0(U)  && && &&  && &&
\end{matrix}$$
where the topologies on the LB-spaces $L_\text{c}^p(U)$ are the canonical LF topologies as defined below (so in particular, they are not the usual norm topologies). The range of each of the maps above (and of any composition of the maps above) is dense in the codomain. Indeed, $C_\text{c}^\infty(U)$ is even sequentially dense in every $C_\text{c}^k(U)$. For every $1 \leq p \leq \infty,$ the canonical inclusion $C_\text{c}^\infty(U) \to L^p(U)$ into the normed space $L^p(U)$ (here $L^p(U)$ has its usual norm topology) is a continuous linear injection and the range of this injection is dense in its codomain if and only if $p \neq \infty$.

Suppose that $X$ is one of the LF-spaces $C_\text{c}^k(U)$ (for $k \in \{0, 1, \ldots, \infty\}$) or LB-spaces $L^p_\text{c}(U)$ (for $1 \leq p \leq \infty$) or normed spaces $L^p(U)$ (for $1 \leq p < \infty$). Because the canonical injection $\operatorname{In}_X : C_\text{c}^\infty(U) \to X$ is a continuous injection whose image is dense in the codomain, this map's transpose ${}^\text{t}\! \operatorname{In}_X : X'_b \to \mathcal{D}'(U) = \left(C_\text{c}^\infty(U)\right)'_b$ is a continuous injection. This injective transpose map thus allows the continuous dual space $X'$ of $X$ to be identified with a certain vector subspace of the space $\mathcal{D}'(U)$ of all distributions (specifically, it is identified with the image of this transpose map). This continuous transpose map is not necessarily a TVS-embedding so the topology that this map transfers from its domain to the image $\operatorname{Im}\left({}^\text{t}\! \operatorname{In}_X\right)$ is finer than the subspace topology that this space inherits from $\mathcal{D}^{\prime}(U)$. A linear subspace of $\mathcal{D}^{\prime}(U)$ carrying a locally convex topology that is finer than the subspace topology induced by $\mathcal{D}^{\prime}(U) = \left(C_\text{c}^\infty(U)\right)^{\prime}_b$ is called a space of distributions. Almost all of the spaces of distributions mentioned in this article arise in this way (e.g. tempered distribution, restrictions, distributions of order $\leq$ some integer, distributions induced by a positive Radon measure, distributions induced by an $L^p$-function, etc.) and any representation theorem about the dual space of X may, through the transpose ${}^\text{t}\! \operatorname{In}_X : X'_b \to \mathcal{D}^{\prime}(U)$, be transferred directly to elements of the space $\operatorname{Im} \left({}^\text{t}\! \operatorname{In}_X\right)$.

=== Compactly supported L^{p}-spaces ===
Given $1 \leq p \leq \infty$, the vector space $L_\text{c}^p(U)$ of compactly supported $L^p$ functions on $U$ and its topology are defined as direct limits of the spaces $L_\text{c}^p(K)$ in a manner analogous to how the canonical LF-topologies on $C_\text{c}^k(U)$ were defined. For any compact $K \subseteq U$, let $L^p(K)$ denote the set of all element in $L^p(U)$ (which recall are equivalence class of Lebesgue measurable $L^p$ functions on $U$) having a representative $f$ whose support (which recall is the closure of $\{u \in U : f(x) \neq 0\}$ in $U$) is a subset of $K$ (such an $f$ is almost everywhere defined in $K$). The set $L^p(K)$ is a closed vector subspace $L^p(U)$ and is thus a Banach space and when $p = 2,$ even a Hilbert space. Let $L_\text{c}^p(U)$ be the union of all $L^p(K)$ as $K \subseteq U$ ranges over all compact subsets of $U.$ The set $L_\text{c}^p(U)$ is a vector subspace of $L^p(U)$ whose elements are the (equivalence classes of) compactly supported $L^p$ functions defined on $U$ (or almost everywhere on $U$). Endow $L_\text{c}^p(U)$ with the final topology (direct limit topology) induced by the inclusion maps $L^p(K) \to L_\text{c}^p(U)$ as $K \subseteq U$ ranges over all compact subsets of $U$. This topology is called the canonical LF topology and it is equal to the final topology induced by any countable set of inclusion maps $L^p(K_n) \to L_\text{c}^p(U)$ ($n = 1, 2, \ldots$) where $K_1 \subseteq K_2 \subseteq \cdots$ are any compact sets with union equal to $U.$ This topology makes $L_\text{c}^p(U)$ into an LB-space (and thus also an LF-space) with a topology that is strictly finer than the norm (subspace) topology that $L^p(U)$ induces on it.

=== Radon measures ===
The inclusion map $\operatorname{In} : C_\text{c}^\infty(U) \to C_\text{c}^0(U)$ is a continuous injection whose image is dense in its codomain, so the transpose ${}^\text{t}\! \operatorname{In} : \left(C_\text{c}^0(U)\right)^{\prime}_b \to \mathcal{D}^{\prime}(U) = \left(C_\text{c}^\infty(U)\right)^{\prime}_b$ is also a continuous injection.

Note that the continuous dual space $\left(C_\text{c}^0(U)\right)^{\prime}_b$ can be identified as the space of Radon measures, where there is a one-to-one correspondence between the continuous linear functionals $T \in \left(C_\text{c}^0(U)\right)^{\prime}_b$ and integral with respect to a Radon measure; that is,

- if $T \in \left(C_\text{c}^0(U)\right)^{\prime}_b$ then there exists a Radon measure $\mu$ on U such that for all $f \in C_\text{c}^0(U), T(f) = \textstyle \int_U f \, d\mu,$ and
- if $\mu$ is a Radon measure on U then the linear functional on $C_\text{c}^0(U)$ defined by $C_\text{c}^0(U) \ni f \mapsto \textstyle \int_U f \, d\mu$ is continuous.

Through the injection ${}^\text{t}\! \operatorname{In} : \left(C_\text{c}^0(U)\right)^{\prime}_b \to \mathcal{D}^{\prime}(U),$ every Radon measure becomes a distribution on U. If $f$ is a locally integrable function on U then the distribution $\phi \mapsto \textstyle \int_U f(x) \phi(x) \, dx$ is a Radon measure; so Radon measures form a large and important space of distributions.

The following is the theorem of the structure of distributions of Radon measures, which shows that every Radon measure can be written as a sum of derivatives of locally $L^\infty$ functions in U:

Theorem.—Suppose $T \in \mathcal{D}'(U)$ is a Radon measure, where $U \subseteq \R^n,$ let $V \subseteq U$ be a neighborhood of the support of $T,$ and let $I = \{p \in \N^n : |p| \leq n\}.$ There exists a family $f=(f_p)_{p\in I}$ of locally $L^\infty$ functions on U such that $\operatorname{supp} f_p \subseteq V$ for every $p\in I$, and
$$T = \sum_{p\in I} \partial^p f_p.$$
Furthermore, $T$ is also equal to a finite sum of derivatives of continuous functions on $U,$ where each derivative has order $\leq 2 n.$

Positive Radon measures

A linear function T on a space of functions is called positive if whenever a function $f$ that belongs to the domain of T is non-negative (meaning that $f$ is real-valued and $f \geq 0$) then $T(f) \geq 0$. One may show that every positive linear functional on $C_\text{c}^0(U)$ is necessarily continuous (that is, necessarily a Radon measure). Lebesgue measure is an example of a positive Radon measure.

==== Locally integrable functions as distributions ====
One particularly important class of Radon measures are those that are induced locally integrable functions. The function $f : U \to \R$ is called locally integrable if it is Lebesgue integrable over every compact subset K of U. (Note: For more information on such class of functions, see the entry on locally integrable functions.) This is a large class of functions which includes all continuous functions and all Lp space $L^p$ functions. The topology on $\mathcal{D}(U)$ is defined in such a fashion that any locally integrable function $f$ yields a continuous linear functional on $\mathcal{D}(U)$ – that is, an element of $\mathcal{D}^{\prime}(U)$ – denoted here by $T_f$, whose value on the test function $\phi$ is given by the Lebesgue integral:
$$\langle T_f, \phi \rangle = \int_U f \phi\,dx.$$

Conventionally, one abuses notation by identifying $T_f$ with $f$, provided no confusion can arise, and thus the pairing between $T_f$ and $\phi$ is often written
$$\langle f, \phi \rangle = \langle T_f, \phi \rangle.$$

If $f$ and g are two locally integrable functions, then the associated distributions $T_f$ and T_{g} are equal to the same element of $\mathcal{D}^{\prime}(U)$ if and only if $f$ and g are equal almost everywhere (see, for instance, Hörmander (1983, Theorem 1.2.5)). In a similar manner, every Radon measure $\mu$ on U defines an element of $\mathcal{D}^{\prime}(U)$ whose value on the test function $\phi$ is $\textstyle\int\phi \,d\mu.$ As above, it is conventional to abuse notation and write the pairing between a Radon measure $\mu$ and a test function $\phi$ as $\langle \mu, \phi \rangle.$ Conversely, as shown in a theorem by Schwartz (similar to the Riesz representation theorem), every distribution which is non-negative on non-negative functions is of this form for some (positive) Radon measure.

Test functions as distributions

The test functions are themselves locally integrable, and so define distributions. The space of test functions $C_\text{c}^\infty(U)$ is sequentially dense in $\mathcal{D}^{\prime}(U)$ with respect to the strong topology on $\mathcal{D}^{\prime}(U).$ This means that for any $T \in \mathcal{D}^{\prime}(U),$ there is a sequence of test functions, $(\phi_i)_{i=1}^\infty,$ that converges to $T \in \mathcal{D}^{\prime}(U)$ (in its strong dual topology) when considered as a sequence of distributions. Or equivalently,
$$\langle \phi_i, \psi \rangle \to \langle T, \psi \rangle \qquad \text{ for all } \psi \in \mathcal{D}(U).$$

Furthermore, $C_\text{c}^\infty(U)$ is also sequentially dense in the strong dual space of $C^\infty(U)$.

=== Distributions with compact support ===
The inclusion map $\operatorname{In} : C_\text{c}^\infty(U) \to C^\infty(U)$ is a continuous injection whose image is dense in its codomain, so the transpose ${}^\text{t}\! \operatorname{In} : \left(C^\infty(U)\right)^{\prime}_b \to \mathcal{D}^{\prime}(U) = \left(C_\text{c}^\infty(U)\right)^{\prime}_b$ is also a continuous injection. Thus the image of the transpose, denoted by $\mathcal{E}^{\prime}(U),$ forms a space of distributions when it is endowed with the strong dual topology of $\left(C^\infty(U)\right)^{\prime}_b$ (transferred to it via the transpose map ${}^\text{t}\! \operatorname{In} : \left(C^\infty(U)\right)^{\prime}_b \to \mathcal{E}^{\prime}(U),$ so the topology of $\mathcal{E}^{\prime}(U)$ is finer than the subspace topology that this set inherits from $\mathcal{D}^{\prime}(U)$).

The elements of $\mathcal{E}^{\prime}(U) = \left(C^\infty(U)\right)^{\prime}_b$ can be identified as the space of distributions with compact support. Explicitly, if T is a distribution on U then the following are equivalent,

- $T \in \mathcal{E}^{\prime}(U)$;
- the support of T is compact;
- the restriction of $T$ to $C_\text{c}^\infty(U),$ when that space is equipped with the subspace topology inherited from $C^\infty(U)$ (a coarser topology than the canonical LF topology), is continuous;
- there is a compact subset K of U such that for every test function $\phi$ whose support is completely outside of K, we have $T(\phi)=0.$

Compactly supported distributions define continuous linear functionals on the space $C^\infty(U)$; recall that the topology on $C^\infty(U)$ is defined such that a sequence of test functions $\phi_k$ converges to 0 if and only if all derivatives of $\phi_k$ converge uniformly to 0 on every compact subset of U. Conversely, it can be shown that every continuous linear functional on this space defines a distribution of compact support. Thus compactly supported distributions can be identified with those distributions that can be extended from $C_\text{c}^\infty(U)$ to $C^\infty(U).$

=== Distributions of finite order ===
Let $k \in \N.$ The inclusion map $\operatorname{In} : C_\text{c}^\infty(U) \to C_\text{c}^k(U)$ is a continuous injection whose image is dense in its codomain, so the transpose ${}^\text{t}\! \operatorname{In} : \left(C_\text{c}^k(U)\right)^{\prime}_b \to \mathcal{D}^{\prime}(U) = \left(C_\text{c}^\infty(U)\right)^{\prime}_b$ is also a continuous injection. Consequently, the image of ${}^\text{t}\! \operatorname{In},$ denoted by $\mathcal{D}'^k(U),$ forms a space of distributions when it is endowed with the strong dual topology of $\left(C_\text{c}^k(U)\right)^{\prime}_b$ (transferred to it via the transpose map ${}^\text{t}\! \operatorname{In} : \left(C^\infty(U)\right)^{\prime}_b \to \mathcal{D}'^k(U),$ so $\mathcal{D}'^{m}(U)$'s topology is finer than the subspace topology that this set inherits from $\mathcal{D}^{\prime}(U)$). The elements of $\mathcal{D}'^k(U)$ are the distributions of order $\,\leq k.$ The distributions of order $\leq 0$, which are also called distributions of order $0$, are exactly the distributions that are Radon measures (described above).

For $0 \neq k \in \N,$ a distribution of order $k$ is a distribution of order $\,\leq k$ that is not a distribution of order $\leq k - 1$

A distribution is said to be of finite order if there is some integer k such that it is a distribution of order $\,\leq k,$ and the set of distributions of finite order is denoted by $\mathcal{D}'^{F}(U).$ Note that if $k \leq 1$ then $\mathcal{D}'^k(U) \subseteq \mathcal{D}'^{l}(U)$ so that $\mathcal{D}'^{F}(U)$ is a vector subspace of $\mathcal{D}^{\prime}(U)$ and furthermore, if and only if $\mathcal{D}'^{F}(U) = \mathcal{D}^{\prime}(U)$.

Structure of distributions of finite order

Every distribution with compact support in U is a distribution of finite order. Indeed, every distribution in U is locally a distribution of finite order, in the following sense: If V is an open and relatively compact subset of U and if $\rho_{VU}$ is the restriction mapping from U to V, then the image of $\mathcal{D}^{\prime}(U)$ under $\rho_{VU}$ is contained in $\mathcal{D}'^{F}(V)$.

The following is the theorem of the structure of distributions of finite order, which shows that every distribution of finite order can be written as a sum of derivatives of Radon measures:

Theorem—Suppose $T \in \mathcal{D}^{\prime}(U)$ has finite order and $I =\{p \in \N^n : |p| \leq k\}.$ Given any open subset V of U containing the support of T, there is a family of Radon measures in U, $(\mu_p)_{p \in I},$ such that for very $p \in I, \operatorname{supp}(\mu_p) \subseteq V$ and
$$T = \sum_{|p| \leq k} \partial^p \mu_p.$$

Example. (Distributions of infinite order) Let $U := (0, \infty)$ and for every test function $f,$ let
$$S f := \sum_{m=1}^\infty (\partial^{m} f)\left(\frac{1}{m}\right).$$

Then S is a distribution of infinite order on U. Moreover, S can not be extended to a distribution on $\R$; that is, there exists no distribution T on $\R$ such that the restriction of T to U is equal to S.

=== Tempered distributions and Fourier transform ===
Defined below are the tempered distributions, which form a subspace of $\mathcal{D}^{\prime}(\R^n),$ the space of distributions on $\R^n.$ This is a proper subspace: while every tempered distribution is a distribution and an element of $\mathcal{D}^{\prime}(\R^n),$ the converse is not true. Tempered distributions are useful if one studies the Fourier transform since all tempered distributions have a Fourier transform, which is not true for an arbitrary distribution in $\mathcal{D}^{\prime}(\R^n).$

Schwartz space

The Schwartz space, $\mathcal{S}(\R^n),$ is the space of all smooth functions that are rapidly decreasing at infinity along with all partial derivatives. Thus $\phi:\R^n\to\R$ is in the Schwartz space provided that any derivative of $\phi,$ multiplied with any power of $|x|,$ converges to 0 as $|x| \to \infty.$ These functions form a complete TVS with a suitably defined family of seminorms. More precisely, for any multi-indices $\alpha$ and $\beta$ define:
$$p_{\alpha, \beta} (\phi) ~=~ \sup_{x \in \R^n} \left|x^\alpha \partial^\beta \phi(x) \right|.$$

Then $\phi$ is in the Schwartz space if all the values satisfy:
$$p_{\alpha, \beta} (\phi) < \infty.$$

The family of seminorms $p_{\alpha,\beta}$ defines a locally convex topology on the Schwartz space. For $n = 1,$ the seminorms are, in fact, norms on the Schwartz space. One can also use the following family of seminorms to define the topology:
$$|f|_{m,k} = \sup_{|p|\leq m} \left(\sup_{x \in \R^n} \left\{(1+|x|)^k \left|(\partial^\alpha f)(x) \right|\right\}\right), \qquad k,m \in \N.$$

Otherwise, one can define a norm on $\mathcal{S}(\R^n)$ via
$$\|\phi \|_k = \max_{|\alpha| + |\beta| \leq k} \sup_{x \in \R^n} \left| x^\alpha \partial^\beta \phi(x)\right|, \qquad k \geq 1.$$

The Schwartz space is a Fréchet space (i.e. a complete metrizable locally convex space). Because the Fourier transform changes $\partial^\alpha$ into multiplication by $x^\alpha$ and vice versa, this symmetry implies that the Fourier transform of a Schwartz function is also a Schwartz function.

A sequence $\{f_i\}$ in $\mathcal{S}(\R^n)$ converges to 0 in $\mathcal{S}(\R^n)$ if and only if the functions $(1 + |x|)^k (\partial^p f_i)(x)$ converge to 0 uniformly in the whole of $\R^n,$ which implies that such a sequence must converge to zero in $C^\infty(\R^n).$

$\mathcal{D}(\R^n)$ is dense in $\mathcal{S}(\R^n).$ The subset of all analytic Schwartz functions is dense in $\mathcal{S}(\R^n)$ as well.

The Schwartz space is nuclear and the tensor product of two maps induces a canonical surjective TVS-isomorphisms
$$\mathcal{S}(\R^m) \ \widehat{\otimes}\ \mathcal{S}(\R^n) \to \mathcal{S}(\R^{m + n}),$$
where $\widehat{\otimes}$ represents the completion of the injective tensor product (which in this case is the identical to the completion of the projective tensor product).

Tempered distributions

The inclusion map $\operatorname{In} : \mathcal{D}(\R^n) \to \mathcal{S}(\R^n)$ is a continuous injection whose image is dense in its codomain, so the transpose ${}^\text{t}\! \operatorname{In} : (\mathcal{S}(\R^n))'_b \to \mathcal{D}^{\prime}(\R^n)$ is also a continuous injection. Thus, the image of the transpose map, denoted by $\mathcal{S}^{\prime}(\R^n)$, forms a space of distributions when it is endowed with the strong dual topology of $(\mathcal{S}(\R^n))'_b$ (transferred to it via the transpose map ${}^\text{t}\! \operatorname{In} : (\mathcal{S}(\R^n))'_b \to \mathcal{D}^{\prime}(\R^n)$, so the topology of $\mathcal{S}^{\prime}(\R^n)$ is finer than the subspace topology that this set inherits from $\mathcal{D}^{\prime}(\R^n)$).

The space $\mathcal{S}^{\prime}(\R^n)$ is called the space of tempered distributions. It is the continuous dual of the Schwartz space. Equivalently, a distribution T is a tempered distribution if and only if
$$\left(\text{ for all } \alpha, \beta \in \N^n: \lim_{m\to \infty} p_{\alpha, \beta} (\phi_m) = 0\right) \Longrightarrow \lim_{m\to \infty} T(\phi_m)=0.$$

The derivative of a tempered distribution is again a tempered distribution. Tempered distributions generalize the bounded (or slow-growing) locally integrable functions; all distributions with compact support and all square-integrable functions are tempered distributions. More generally, all functions that are products of polynomials with elements of Lp space $L^p(\R^n)$ for $p \geq 1$ are tempered distributions.

The tempered distributions can also be characterized as slowly growing, meaning that each derivative of T grows at most as fast as some polynomial. This characterization is dual to the rapidly falling behaviour of the derivatives of a function in the Schwartz space, where each derivative of $\phi$ decays faster than every inverse power of $|x|.$ An example of a rapidly falling function is $|x|^n\exp (-\lambda |x|^\beta)$ for any positive $n, \lambda, \beta.$

Fourier transform

To study the Fourier transform, it is best to consider complex-valued test functions and complex-linear distributions. The ordinary continuous Fourier transform $F : \mathcal{S}(\R^n) \to \mathcal{S}(\R^n)$ is a TVS-automorphism of the Schwartz space, and the Fourier transform is defined to be its transpose ${}^\text{t}\! F : \mathcal{S}^{\prime}(\R^n) \to \mathcal{S}^{\prime}(\R^n),$ which (abusing notation) will again be denoted by F. So the Fourier transform of the tempered distribution T is defined by $(FT)(\psi) = T(F \psi)$ for every Schwartz function $\psi.$ $FT$ is thus again a tempered distribution. The Fourier transform is a TVS isomorphism from the space of tempered distributions onto itself. This operation is compatible with differentiation in the sense that
$$F \dfrac{dT}{dx} = ixFT$$
and also with convolution: if T is a tempered distribution and $\psi$ is a slowly increasing smooth function on $\R^n,$ $\psi T$ is again a tempered distribution and
$$F(\psi T) = F \psi * FT$$
is the convolution of $FT$ and $F \psi$. In particular, the Fourier transform of the constant function equal to 1 is the $\delta$ distribution.

Expressing tempered distributions as sums of derivatives

If $T \in \mathcal{S}^{\prime}(\R^n)$ is a tempered distribution, then there exists a constant $C > 0,$ and positive integers M and N such that for all Schwartz functions $\phi \in \mathcal{S}(\R^n)$
$$\langle T, \phi \rangle \leq C\sum\nolimits_{|\alpha|\leq N, |\beta|\leq M}\sup_{x \in \R^n} \left|x^\alpha \partial^\beta \phi(x) \right|=C\sum\nolimits_{|\alpha|\leq N, |\beta|\leq M} p_{\alpha, \beta}(\phi).$$

This estimate along with some techniques from functional analysis can be used to show that there is a continuous slowly increasing function F and a multi-index $\alpha$ such that
$$T = \partial^\alpha F.$$

Restriction of distributions to compact sets

If $T \in \mathcal{D}^{\prime}(\R^n),$ then for any compact set $K \subseteq \R^n,$ there exists a continuous function F compactly supported in $\R^n$ (possibly on a larger set than K itself) and a multi-index $\alpha$ such that $T = \partial^\alpha F$ on $C_\text{c}^\infty(K)$.

== Tensor product of distributions ==
Let $U \subseteq \R^m$ and $V \subseteq \R^n$ be open sets. Assume all vector spaces to be over the field $\mathbb{F},$ where $\mathbb{F}=\R$ or $\Complex.$ For $f \in \mathcal{D}(U \times V)$ define for every $u \in U$ and every $v \in V$ the following functions:
$$\begin{alignat}{9}
f_u : \,& V && \to    \,&& \mathbb{F} && \quad \text{ and } \quad && f^v : \,&& U && \to    \,&& \mathbb{F} \\
& y && \mapsto\,&& f(u, y)    &&                          &&         && x && \mapsto\,&& f(x, v) \\
\end{alignat}$$

Given $S \in \mathcal{D}^{\prime}(U)$ and $T \in \mathcal{D}^{\prime}(V),$ define the following functions:
$$\begin{alignat}{9}
\langle S, f^{\bullet}\rangle : \,& V && \to    \,&& \mathbb{F} && \quad \text{ and } \quad && \langle T, f_{\bullet}\rangle : \,&& U && \to    \,&& \mathbb{F} \\
& v && \mapsto\,&& \langle S, f^v \rangle &&              &&                                   && u && \mapsto\,&& \langle T, f_u \rangle \\
\end{alignat}$$
where $\langle T, f_{\bullet}\rangle \in \mathcal{D}(U)$ and $\langle S, f^{\bullet}\rangle \in \mathcal{D}(V).$ These definitions associate every $S \in \mathcal{D}'(U)$ and $T \in \mathcal{D}'(V)$ with the (respective) continuous linear map:
$$\begin{alignat}{9}
\,& \mathcal{D}(U \times V) && \to    \,&& \mathcal{D}(V) && \quad \text{ and } \quad &&   \,&& \mathcal{D}(U \times V) && \to    \,&& \mathcal{D}(U) \\
& f                       && \mapsto\,&& \langle S, f^{\bullet} \rangle    &&       &&     && f                       && \mapsto\,&& \langle T, f_{\bullet} \rangle \\
\end{alignat}$$

Moreover, if either $S$ (resp. $T$) has compact support then it also induces a continuous linear map of $C^\infty(U \times V) \to C^\infty(V)$ (resp. $C^\infty(U \times V) \to C^\infty(U)$).

Fubini's theorem for distributions—Let $S \in \mathcal{D}'(U)$ and $T \in \mathcal{D}'(V).$ If $f \in \mathcal{D}(U \times V)$ then
$$\langle S, \langle T, f_{\bullet} \rangle \rangle = \langle T, \langle S, f^{\bullet} \rangle \rangle.$$

The tensor product of $S \in \mathcal{D}'(U)$ and $T \in \mathcal{D}'(V),$ denoted by $S \otimes T$ or $T \otimes S,$ is the distribution in $U \times V$ defined by:
$$(S \otimes T)(f) := \langle S, \langle T, f_{\bullet} \rangle \rangle = \langle T, \langle S, f^{\bullet}\rangle \rangle.$$

=== Schwartz kernel theorem ===
The tensor product defines a bilinear map
$$\begin{alignat}{4}
\,& \mathcal{D}^{\prime}(U) \times \mathcal{D}^{\prime}(V) && \to    \,&& \mathcal{D}^{\prime}(U \times V) \\
& ~~~~~~~~(S, T) && \mapsto\,&& S \otimes T \\
\end{alignat}$$
the span of the range of this map is a dense subspace of its codomain. Furthermore, $\operatorname{supp} (S \otimes T) = \operatorname{supp}(S) \times \operatorname{supp}(T).$ Moreover $(S,T) \mapsto S \otimes T$ induces continuous bilinear maps:
$$\begin{alignat}{8}
&\mathcal{E}^{\prime}(U) &&\times \mathcal{E}^{\prime}(V) &&\to \mathcal{E}^{\prime}(U \times V) \\
&\mathcal{S}^{\prime}(\R^m) &&\times \mathcal{S}^{\prime}(\R^n) &&\to \mathcal{S}^{\prime}(\R^{m + n}) \\
\end{alignat}$$
where $\mathcal{E}'$ denotes the space of distributions with compact support and $\mathcal{S}$ is the Schwartz space of rapidly decreasing functions.

Schwartz kernel theorem—Each of the canonical maps below (defined in the natural way) are TVS isomorphisms:
$$\begin{alignat}{8}
&\mathcal{S}^{\prime}(\R^{m+n}) ~&&~\cong~&&~ \mathcal{S}^{\prime}(\R^m) \ &&\widehat{\otimes}\ \mathcal{S}^{\prime}(\R^n) ~&&~\cong~&&~ L_b(\mathcal{S}(\R^m); &&\;\mathcal{S}^{\prime}(\R^n)) \\
&\mathcal{E}^{\prime}(U \times V) ~&&~\cong~&&~ \mathcal{E}^{\prime}(U) \ &&\widehat{\otimes}\ \mathcal{E}^{\prime}(V) ~&&~\cong~&&~ L_b(C^\infty(U); &&\;\mathcal{E}^{\prime}(V)) \\
&\mathcal{D}^{\prime}(U \times V) ~&&~\cong~&&~ \mathcal{D}^{\prime}(U) \ &&\widehat{\otimes}\ \mathcal{D}^{\prime}(V) ~&&~\cong~&&~ L_b(\mathcal{D}(U); &&\;\mathcal{D}^{\prime}(V)) \\
\end{alignat}$$
Here $\widehat{\otimes}$ represents the completion of the injective tensor product (which in this case is identical to the completion of the projective tensor product, since these spaces are nuclear) and $L_b(X;Y)$ has the topology of uniform convergence on bounded subsets.

This result does not hold for Hilbert spaces such as $L^2$ and its dual space. Why does such a result hold for the space of distributions and test functions but not for other "nice" spaces like the Hilbert space $L^2$? This question led Alexander Grothendieck to discover nuclear spaces, nuclear maps, and the injective tensor product. He ultimately showed that it is precisely because $\mathcal{D}(U)$ is a nuclear space that the Schwartz kernel theorem holds. Like Hilbert spaces, nuclear spaces may be thought as of generalizations of finite dimensional Euclidean space.

== Using holomorphic functions as test functions ==
The success of the theory led to investigation of the idea of hyperfunction, in which spaces of holomorphic functions are used as test functions. A refined theory has been developed, in particular Mikio Sato's algebraic analysis, using sheaf theory and several complex variables. This extends the range of symbolic methods that can be made into rigorous mathematics, for example Feynman integrals.

== See also ==
- Colombeau algebra
- Current (mathematics) – Distributions on spaces of differential forms
- Distribution (number theory)
- Distribution on a linear algebraic group – Linear function satisfying a support condition
- Gelfand triple – Construction for adding objects to a Hilbert space
- Generalized function – Objects extending the notion of functions
- Homogeneous distribution – Type of mathematical distribution
- Hyperfunction – Type of generalized function
- Laplacian of the indicator – Limit of sequence of smooth functions
- Limit of a distribution
- Linear form – Linear map from a vector space to its field of scalars
- Malgrange–Ehrenpreis theorem
- Pseudodifferential operator – Type of differential operator
- Riesz representation theorem – Theorem about the dual of a Hilbert space
- Vague topology
- Weak solution – Mathematical solution

== Bibliography ==
- Barros-Neto, José (1973). An Introduction to the Theory of Distributions. New York, NY: Dekker.
- Benedetto, J.J. (1997), Harmonic Analysis and Applications, CRC Press.
- Folland, G.B. (1989). Harmonic Analysis in Phase Space. Princeton, NJ: Princeton University Press.
- Friedlander, F.G.; Joshi, M.S. (1998). Introduction to the Theory of Distributions. Cambridge, UK: Cambridge University Press..
- Gårding, L. (1997), Some Points of Analysis and their History, American Mathematical Society.
- Gel'fand, I.M.; Shilov, G.E. (1966–1968), Generalized functions, vol. 1–5, Academic Press.
- Grubb, G. (2009), Distributions and Operators, Springer.
- Hörmander, L. (1983), The analysis of linear partial differential operators I, Grundl. Math. Wissenschaft., vol. 256, Springer, doi:10.1007/978-3-642-96750-4, ISBN 3-540-12104-8, MR 0717035.
- Horváth, John (1966). Topological Vector Spaces and Distributions. Addison-Wesley series in mathematics. Vol. 1. Reading, MA: Addison-Wesley Publishing Company. ISBN 978-0201029857.
- Kolmogorov, Andrey; Fomin, Sergei V. (2012) [1957]. Elements of the Theory of Functions and Functional Analysis. Dover Books on Mathematics. New York: Dover Books. ISBN 978-1-61427-304-2. OCLC 912495626.
- Narici, Lawrence; Beckenstein, Edward (2011). Topological Vector Spaces. Pure and applied mathematics (Second ed.). Boca Raton, FL: CRC Press. ISBN 978-1584888666. OCLC 144216834.
- Petersen, Bent E. (1983). Introduction to the Fourier Transform and Pseudo-Differential Operators. Boston, MA: Pitman Publishing..
- Rudin, Walter (1991). Functional Analysis. International Series in Pure and Applied Mathematics. Vol. 8 (Second ed.). New York, NY: McGraw-Hill Science/Engineering/Math. ISBN 978-0-07-054236-5. OCLC 21163277.
- Schaefer, Helmut H.; Wolff, Manfred P. (1999). Topological Vector Spaces. GTM. Vol. 8 (Second ed.). New York, NY: Springer New York Imprint Springer. ISBN 978-1-4612-7155-0. OCLC 840278135.
- Schwartz, Laurent (1954), "Sur l'impossibilité de la multiplications des distributions", C. R. Acad. Sci. Paris, 239: 847–848.
- Schwartz, Laurent (1951), Théorie des distributions, vol. 1–2, Hermann.
- Sobolev, S.L. (1936), "Méthode nouvelle à résoudre le problème de Cauchy pour les équations linéaires hyperboliques normales", Mat. Sbornik, 1: 39–72.
- Stein, Elias; Weiss, Guido (1971), Introduction to Fourier Analysis on Euclidean Spaces, Princeton University Press, ISBN 0-691-08078-X.
- Strichartz, R. (1994), A Guide to Distribution Theory and Fourier Transforms, CRC Press, ISBN 0-8493-8273-4.
- Trèves, François (2006) [1967]. Topological Vector Spaces, Distributions and Kernels. Mineola, N.Y.: Dover Publications. ISBN 978-0-486-45352-1. OCLC 853623322.
- Woodward, P.M. (1953). Probability and Information Theory with Applications to Radar. Oxford, UK: Pergamon Press.
