= Order convergence =

In mathematics, specifically in order theory and functional analysis, a filter $\mathcal{F}$ in an order complete vector lattice $X$ is order convergent if it contains an order bounded subset (that is, a subset contained in an interval of the form $[a, b] := \{ x \in X : a \leq x \text{ and } x \leq b \}$) and if
$$\sup \left\{ \inf S : S \in \operatorname{OBound}(X) \cap \mathcal{F} \right\} = \inf \left\{ \sup S : S \in \operatorname{OBound}(X) \cap \mathcal{F} \right\},$$
where $\operatorname{OBound}(X)$ is the set of all order bounded subsets of X, in which case this common value is called the order limit of $\mathcal{F}$ in $X.$

Order convergence plays an important role in the theory of vector lattices because the definition of order convergence does not depend on any topology.

== Definition ==
A net $\left(x_{\alpha}\right)_{\alpha \in A}$ in a vector lattice $X$ is said to decrease to $x_0 \in X$ if $\alpha \leq \beta$ implies $x_{\beta} \leq x_{\alpha}$ and $x_0 = inf \left\{ x_{\alpha} : \alpha \in A \right\}$ in $X.$ A net $\left(x_{\alpha}\right)_{\alpha \in A}$ in a vector lattice $X$ is said to order-converge to $x_0 \in X$ if there is a net $\left(y_{\alpha}\right)_{\alpha \in A}$ in $X$ that decreases to $0$ and satisfies $\left|x_{\alpha} - x_0\right| \leq y_{\alpha}$ for all $\alpha \in A$.

== Order continuity ==
A linear map $T : X \to Y$ between vector lattices is said to be order continuous if whenever $\left(x_{\alpha}\right)_{\alpha \in A}$ is a net in $X$ that order-converges to $x_0$ in $X,$ then the net $\left(T\left(x_{\alpha}\right)\right)_{\alpha \in A}$ order-converges to $T\left(x_0\right)$ in $Y.$ $T$ is said to be sequentially order continuous if whenever $\left(x_n\right)_{n \in \N}$ is a sequence in $X$ that order-converges to $x_0$ in $X,$then the sequence $\left(T\left(x_n\right)\right)_{n \in \N}$ order-converges to $T\left(x_0\right)$ in $Y.$

== Related results ==
In an order complete vector lattice $X$ whose order is regular, $X$ is of minimal type if and only if every order convergent filter in $X$ converges when $X$ is endowed with the order topology.

== See also ==
- Banach lattice – Banach space with a compatible structure of a lattice
- Fréchet lattice – Topological vector lattice
- Locally convex lattice
- Normed lattice
- Vector lattice – Partially ordered vector space, ordered as a lattice
