= L-space =

L-space may refer to:

- The classical function spaces L^{p} and $\ell^p$
- L-space (topology), a hereditarily Lindelöf space
- The Banach lattice, an abstract normed Riesz space
- The interdimensional space connecting all libraries in Terry Pratchett's fictional Discworld setting
