= Quasi-reflexive =

Quasi-reflexive may refer to:

- Quasi-reflexive relation
- Quasi-reflexive space
