= Fréchet lattice =

Topological vector lattice

In mathematics, specifically in order theory and functional analysis, a Fréchet lattice is a topological vector lattice that is also a Fréchet space. Fréchet lattices are important in the theory of topological vector lattices.

== Properties ==
Every Fréchet lattice is a locally convex vector lattice. The set of all weak order units of a separable Fréchet lattice is a dense subset of its positive cone.

== Examples ==
Every Banach lattice is a Fréchet lattice.

== See also ==
- Banach lattice – Banach space with a compatible structure of a lattice
- Locally convex vector lattice
- Join and meet – Concept in order theory
- Normed lattice
- Vector lattice – Partially ordered vector space, ordered as a lattice

== Bibliography ==
- Narici, Lawrence; Beckenstein, Edward (2011). Topological Vector Spaces. Pure and applied mathematics (Second ed.). Boca Raton, FL: CRC Press. ISBN 978-1584888666. OCLC 144216834.
- Schaefer, Helmut H.; Wolff, Manfred P. (1999). Topological Vector Spaces. GTM. Vol. 8 (Second ed.). New York, NY: Springer New York Imprint Springer. ISBN 978-1-4612-7155-0. OCLC 840278135.
