= Robert C. James =

American mathematician (1918–2004)

Robert Clarke James (1918 – September 25, 2004) was an American mathematician who worked in functional analysis.

== Biography ==
James attended UCLA as an undergraduate, where his father was a professor. As a devout Quaker, he was a conscientious objector during World War II.

He obtained his PhD at Caltech in 1946 under the direction of Aristotle Demetrius Michal. He spent a year as a Benjamin Peirce Fellow at Harvard and joined the faculty at UC Berkeley. In 1950, during the loyalty oath controversy, James refused to sign the oath and moved to Haverford College. Later he was the founding math department chair both at Harvey Mudd College and at the Claremont Graduate University.

James constructed a number of counterexamples in the theory of Banach spaces, including James' space and James' tree space. He also characterized reflexivity for Banach spaces with an unconditional Schauder basis and proved an eponymous compactness criterion.

With his father Glenn James (a professor at UCLA and long-time editor of Mathematics Magazine) he published a mathematical dictionary which went through several editions.

James was made a Fellow of the American Association for the Advancement of Science in 1978.

== Selected works ==
- James, Robert C.; James, Glenn (1992). Mathematics Dictionary (5th ed.). New York: Chapman & Hall. ISBN 0412990415.
- James, Robert C. (March 1951). "A non-reflexive Banach space isometric with its second conjugate space". Proceedings of the National Academy of Sciences. 37 (3): 174–177. Bibcode:1951PNAS...37..174J. doi:10.1073/pnas.37.3.174. PMC 1063327. PMID 16588998. MR 0044024
- James, Robert C. (1981). "Structure of Banach spaces: Radon-Nikodým and other properties". General topology and modern analysis (Proceedings of a conference at the University of California, Riverside, Calif., 1980). New York: Academic Press. pp. 347–363. ISBN 0-12-481820-X.
- James, Robert C. (November 1982). "Bases in Banach spaces". The American Mathematical Monthly. 89 (9): 625–640. doi:10.2307/2975644. JSTOR 2975644. MR 0678808
