= Schwartz space =

Function space of all functions whose derivatives are rapidly decreasing

In mathematics, Schwartz space $\mathcal{S}$ is the function space of all functions whose derivatives of all orders are rapidly decreasing. This space has the important property that the Fourier transform is an automorphism on this space. This property enables one, by duality, to define the Fourier transform for elements in the dual space $\mathcal{S}^*$ of $\mathcal{S}$, that is, for tempered distributions. A function in the Schwartz space is sometimes called a Schwartz function.

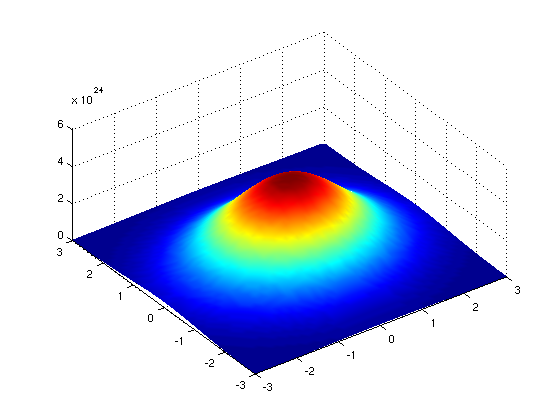
A two-dimensional Gaussian function is an example of a rapidly decreasing function.

Schwartz space is named after French mathematician Laurent Schwartz.

== Definition ==
Let $\mathbb{N}$ be the set of non-negative integers, and for any $n \in \mathbb{N}$, let $\mathbb{N}^n := \underbrace{\mathbb{N} \times \dots \times \mathbb{N}}_{n \text{ times}}$ be the $n$-fold Cartesian product.

The Schwartz space or space of rapidly decreasing functions on $\mathbb{R}^n$ is the function space
$$\mathcal{S} \left(\mathbb{R}^n, \mathbb{C}\right) := \left \{ f \in C^\infty(\mathbb{R}^n, \mathbb{C}) \mid \forall \boldsymbol{\alpha},\boldsymbol{\beta}\in\mathbb{N}^n, \|f\|_{\boldsymbol{\alpha},\boldsymbol{\beta}}< \infty\right \},$$
where $C^{\infty}(\mathbb{R}^n, \mathbb{C})$ is the function space of smooth functions from $\mathbb{R}^n$ into $\mathbb{C}$, and
$$\|f\|_{\boldsymbol{\alpha},\boldsymbol{\beta}}:= \sup_{\boldsymbol{x}\in\mathbb{R}^n} \left| \boldsymbol{x}^\boldsymbol{\alpha} (\boldsymbol{D}^\boldsymbol{\beta} f)(\boldsymbol{x}) \right|.$$
Here, $\sup$ denotes the supremum, and we used multi-index notation, i.e. $\boldsymbol{x}^\boldsymbol{\alpha} := x_1^{\alpha_1}x_2^{\alpha_2}\ldots x_n^{\alpha_n}$ and $D^\boldsymbol{\beta} := \partial_1^{\beta_1}\partial_2^{\beta_2}\ldots \partial_n^{\beta_n}$.

To put common language to this definition, one could consider a rapidly decreasing function as essentially a function $f$ such that $f(x)$, $f'(x)$, $f^{\prime\prime}(x)$, ... all exist everywhere on $\mathbb{R}$ and go to zero as $x \rightarrow \pm \infty$ faster than any reciprocal power of $x$. In particular, $\mathcal{S}\left(\mathbb{R}^n, \mathbb{C}\right)$ is a subspace of $C^{\infty}(\mathbb{R}^n, \mathbb{C})$.

== Examples of functions in the Schwartz space ==
- If $\boldsymbol{\alpha}$ is a multi-index, and a is a positive real number, then $\boldsymbol{x}^\boldsymbol{\alpha} e^{-a \vert \boldsymbol{x} \vert^2} \in \mathcal{S}(\mathbb{R}^n)$.
- Any smooth function $f$ with compact support is in $\mathcal{S}\left(\mathbb{R}^n\right)$. This is clear since any derivative of $f$ is continuous and supported in the support of $f$, so $(\boldsymbol{x}^\boldsymbol{\alpha}\boldsymbol{D}^\boldsymbol{\alpha})f$ has a maximum in $\mathbb{R}^n$ by the extreme value theorem.
- Because the Schwartz space is a vector space, any polynomial $\phi(\boldsymbol{x})$ can be multiplied by a factor $e^{-a \vert\boldsymbol{x}\vert^2}$ for $a > 0$ a real constant, to give an element of the Schwartz space. In particular, there is an embedding of polynomials into a Schwartz space.

== Properties ==
=== Analytic properties ===
- From Leibniz's rule, it follows that $\mathcal{S}\left(\mathbb{R}^n\right)$ is also closed under pointwise multiplication: $f, g \in \mathcal{S}\left(\mathbb{R}^n\right)$ implies $fg \in \mathcal{S}\left(\mathbb{R}^n\right)$. In particular, this implies that $\mathcal{S}\left(\mathbb{R}^n\right)$ is an $\mathbb{R}$-algebra. More generally, if $f \in\mathcal{S}\left(\mathbb{R}\right)$ and $H$ is a bounded smooth function with bounded derivatives of all orders, then $fH \in\mathcal{S}\left(\mathbb{R}\right)$.
- The Fourier transform is a linear isomorphism $\mathcal F:\mathcal{S}\left(\mathbb{R}^n\right) \rightarrow \mathcal{S}\left(\mathbb{R}^n\right)$.
- If $f \in \mathcal{S}\left(\mathbb{R}^n\right)$ then $f$ is Lipschitz continuous and hence uniformly continuous on $\mathbb{R}^n$.
- $\mathcal{S}\left(\mathbb{R}^n\right)$ is a distinguished locally convex Fréchet Schwartz TVS over the complex numbers.
- Both $\mathcal{S}\left(\mathbb{R}^n\right)$ and its strong dual space are also:
1. complete Hausdorff locally convex spaces,
2. nuclear Montel spaces,
3. ultrabornological spaces,
4. reflexive barrelled Mackey spaces.

=== Relation of Schwartz spaces with other topological vector spaces ===
- If $1 \leqslant p < \infty$, then $\mathcal{S}\left(\mathbb{R}^n\right)$ is a dense subset of $L^p(\mathbb{R}^n)$.
- The space of all bump functions, $C_\text{c}^\infty\left(\mathbb{R}^n\right)$, is included in $\mathcal{S}\left(\mathbb{R}^n\right)$.

== See also ==
- Bump function
- Schwartz–Bruhat function
- Nuclear space
