= Grothendieck space =

In mathematics, a Grothendieck space, named after Alexander Grothendieck, is a Banach space $X$ in which every sequence in its continuous dual space $X^{\prime}$ that converges in the weak-* topology $\sigma\left(X^{\prime}, X\right)$ (also known as the topology of pointwise convergence) will also converge when $X^{\prime}$ is endowed with $\sigma\left(X^{\prime}, X^{\prime \prime}\right),$ which is the weak topology induced on $X^{\prime}$ by its bidual. Said differently, a Grothendieck space is a Banach space for which a sequence in its dual space converges weak-* if and only if it converges weakly.

== Characterizations ==
Let $X$ be a Banach space. Then the following conditions are equivalent:

1. $X$ is a Grothendieck space,
2. for every separable Banach space $Y,$ every bounded linear operator from $X$ to $Y$ is weakly compact, that is, the image of a bounded subset of $X$ is a weakly compact subset of $Y.$
3. for every weakly compactly generated Banach space $Y,$ every bounded linear operator from $X$ to $Y$ is weakly compact.
4. every weak*-continuous function on the dual $X^{\prime}$ is weakly Riemann integrable.

== Examples ==
- Every reflexive Banach space is a Grothendieck space. Conversely, it is a consequence of the Eberlein–Šmulian theorem that a separable Grothendieck space $X$ must be reflexive, since the identity from $X \to X$ is weakly compact in this case.
- Grothendieck spaces which are not reflexive include the space $C(K)$ of all continuous functions on a Stonean compact space $K,$ and the space $L^{\infty}(\mu)$ for a positive measure $\mu$ (a Stonean compact space is a Hausdorff compact space in which the closure of every open set is open).
- Jean Bourgain proved that the space $H^{\infty}$ of bounded holomorphic functions on the disk is a Grothendieck space.

== See also ==
- Dunford–Pettis property
