= James' space =

In the area of mathematics known as functional analysis, James' space is an important example in the theory of Banach spaces and commonly serves as useful counterexample to general statements concerning the structure of general Banach spaces. The space was first introduced in 1950 in a short paper by Robert C. James.

James' space serves as an example of a space that is isometrically isomorphic to its double dual, while not being reflexive. Furthermore, James' space has a basis, while having no unconditional basis.

== Definition ==
Let $\mathcal{P}$ denote the family of all finite increasing sequences of integers of odd length. For any sequence of real numbers $x=(x_n)$ and $p = (p_1,p_2,\ldots,p_{2n+1}) \in \mathcal{P}$ we define the quantity

$$\|x\|_p := \left( x_{p_{2n+1}}^2 + \sum_{m=1}^n (x_{p_{2m-1}} - x_{p_{2m}})^2 \right)^{1/2}.$$

James' space, denoted by J, is defined to be all elements x from c_{0} satisfying $\sup\{\|x\|_p:p\in\mathcal{P}\} < \infty$, endowed with the norm $\|x\| := \sup\{\|x\|_p:p\in\mathcal{P}\} \ (x\in \mathbf{J})$.

== Properties ==
- James' space is a Banach space.
- The canonical basis {e_{n}} is a (conditional) Schauder basis for J. Furthermore, this basis is both monotone and shrinking.
- J has no unconditional basis.
- James' space is not reflexive. Its image into its double dual under the canonical embedding has codimension one.
- James' space is however isometrically isomorphic to its double dual.
- James' space is somewhat reflexive, meaning every closed infinite-dimensional subspace contains an infinite dimensional reflexive subspace. In particular, every closed infinite-dimensional subspace contains an isomorphic copy of ℓ_{2}.

== See also ==
- Tsirelson space
- Reflexive space
