= Montel space =

Barrelled space where closed and bounded subsets are compact

In functional analysis and related areas of mathematics, a Montel space, named after Paul Montel, is any topological vector space (TVS) in which an analog of Montel's theorem holds. Specifically, a Montel space is a barrelled topological vector space in which every closed and bounded subset is compact.

== Definition ==
A topological vector space (TVS) has the Heine–Borel property if every closed and bounded subset is compact. A Montel space is a barrelled topological vector space with the Heine–Borel property. Equivalently, it is an infrabarrelled semi-Montel space where a Hausdorff locally convex topological vector space is called a semi-Montel space or perfect if every bounded subset is relatively compact. (Note: A subset $S$ of a topological space $X$ is called relatively compact is its closure in $X$ is compact.) A subset of a TVS is compact if and only if it is complete and totally bounded. A Fréchet–Montel space is a Fréchet space that is also a Montel space.

== Characterizations ==
A separable Fréchet space is a Montel space if and only if each weak-* convergent sequence in its continuous dual is strongly convergent.

A Fréchet space $X$ is a Montel space if and only if every bounded continuous function $X \to c_0$ sends closed bounded absolutely convex subsets of $X$ to relatively compact subsets of $c_0.$ Moreover, if $C^b(X)$ denotes the vector space of all bounded continuous functions on a Fréchet space $X,$ then $X$ is Montel if and only if every sequence in $C^b(X)$ that converges to zero in the compact-open topology also converges uniformly to zero on all closed bounded absolutely convex subsets of $X.$

== Sufficient conditions ==
Semi-Montel spaces

A closed vector subspace of a semi-Montel space is again a semi-Montel space. The locally convex direct sum of any family of semi-Montel spaces is again a semi-Montel space. The inverse limit of an inverse system consisting of semi-Montel spaces is again a semi-Montel space. The Cartesian product of any family of semi-Montel spaces (resp. Montel spaces) is again a semi-Montel space (resp. a Montel space).

Montel spaces

The strong dual of a Montel space is Montel. A barrelled quasi-complete nuclear space is a Montel space. Every product and locally convex direct sum of a family of Montel spaces is a Montel space. The strict inductive limit of a sequence of Montel spaces is a Montel space. In contrast, closed subspaces and separated quotients of Montel spaces are in general not even reflexive. Every Fréchet Schwartz space is a Montel space.

== Properties ==
Montel spaces are paracompact and normal. Semi-Montel spaces are quasi-complete and semi-reflexive while Montel spaces are reflexive.

No infinite-dimensional Banach space is a Montel space. This is because a Banach space cannot satisfy the Heine–Borel property: the closed unit ball is closed and bounded, but not compact. Fréchet Montel spaces are separable and have a bornological strong dual. A metrizable Montel space is separable.

Fréchet–Montel spaces are distinguished spaces.

== Examples ==
In classical complex analysis, Montel's theorem asserts that the space of holomorphic functions on an open connected subset of the complex numbers has this property.

Many Montel spaces of contemporary interest arise as spaces of test functions for a space of distributions. The space $C^{\infty}(\Omega)$ of smooth functions on an open set $\Omega$ in $\R^n$ is a Montel space equipped with the topology induced by the family of seminorms
$$\|f\|_{K,n} = \sup_{|\alpha| \leq n}\sup_{x \in K}\left|\partial^\alpha f(x)\right|$$
for $n = 1, 2, \ldots$ and $K$ ranges over compact subsets of $\Omega,$ and $\alpha$ is a multi-index. Similarly, the space of compactly supported functions in an open set with the final topology of the family of inclusions $\scriptstyle{C^\infty_0(K)\subset C^\infty_0(\Omega)}$ as $K$ ranges over all compact subsets of $\Omega.$ The Schwartz space is also a Montel space.

=== Counter-examples ===
Every infinite-dimensional normed space is a barrelled space that is not a Montel space. In particular, every infinite-dimensional Banach space is not a Montel space. There exist Montel spaces that are not separable and there exist Montel spaces that are not complete. There exist Montel spaces having closed vector subspaces that are not Montel spaces.

== See also ==
- Barrelled space – Type of topological vector space
- Bornological space – Space where bounded operators are continuous
- Heine–Borel theorem – Subset of Euclidean space is compact if and only if it is closed and bounded
- LB-space
- LF-space – Topological vector space
- Nuclear space – Generalization of finite-dimensional Euclidean spaces different from Hilbert spaces
