= Normed vector lattice =

In mathematics, specifically in order theory and functional analysis, a normed lattice is a topological vector lattice that is also a normed space whose unit ball is a solid set. Normed lattices are important in the theory of topological vector lattices. They are closely related to Banach vector lattices, which are normed vector lattices that are also Banach spaces.

== Properties ==
Every normed lattice is a locally convex vector lattice.

The strong dual of a normed lattice is a Banach lattice with respect to the dual norm and canonical order. If it is also a Banach space then its continuous dual space is equal to its order dual.

== Examples ==
Every Banach lattice is a normed lattice.

== See also ==
- Banach lattice – Banach space with a compatible structure of a lattice
- Fréchet lattice – Topological vector lattice
- Locally convex vector lattice
- Vector lattice – Partially ordered vector space, ordered as a lattice

== Bibliography ==
- Narici, Lawrence; Beckenstein, Edward (2011). Topological Vector Spaces. Pure and applied mathematics (Second ed.). Boca Raton, FL: CRC Press. ISBN 978-1584888666. OCLC 144216834.
- Schaefer, Helmut H.; Wolff, Manfred P. (1999). Topological Vector Spaces. GTM. Vol. 8 (Second ed.). New York, NY: Springer New York Imprint Springer. ISBN 978-1-4612-7155-0. OCLC 840278135.
