= Reflexive space =

Locally convex topological vector space

In the area of mathematics known as functional analysis, a reflexive space is a locally convex topological vector space for which the canonical evaluation map from $X$ into its bidual (which is the strong dual of the strong dual of $X$) is a homeomorphism (or equivalently, a TVS isomorphism). A normed space is reflexive if and only if this canonical evaluation map is surjective, in which case this (always linear) evaluation map is an isometric isomorphism and the normed space is a Banach space. Those spaces for which the canonical evaluation map is surjective are called semi-reflexive spaces.

In 1951, R. C. James discovered a Banach space, now known as James' space, that is not reflexive (meaning that the canonical evaluation map is not an isomorphism) but is nevertheless isometrically isomorphic to its bidual (any such isometric isomorphism is necessarily not the canonical evaluation map). So importantly, for a Banach space to be reflexive, it is not enough for it to be isometrically isomorphic to its bidual; it is the canonical evaluation map in particular that has to be a homeomorphism.

Reflexive spaces play an important role in the general theory of locally convex TVSs and in the theory of Banach spaces in particular. Hilbert spaces are prominent examples of reflexive Banach spaces. Reflexive Banach spaces are often characterized by their geometric properties.

== Definition ==
Definition of the bidual

Suppose that $X$ is a topological vector space (TVS) over the field $\mathbb{F}$ (which is either the real or complex numbers) whose continuous dual space, $X^{\prime},$ separates points on $X$ (that is, for any $x \in X, x \neq 0$ there exists some $x^{\prime} \in X^{\prime}$ such that $x^{\prime}(x) \neq 0$). Let $X^{\prime}_b$ (some texts write $X^{\prime}_\beta$) denote the strong dual of $X,$ which is the vector space $X^{\prime}$ of continuous linear functionals on $X$ endowed with the topology of uniform convergence on bounded subsets of $X$; this topology is also called the strong dual topology and it is the "default" topology placed on a continuous dual space (unless another topology is specified). If $X$ is a normed space, then the strong dual of $X$ is the continuous dual space $X^{\prime}$ with its usual norm topology. The bidual of $X,$ denoted by $X^{\prime\prime},$ is the strong dual of $X^{\prime}_b$; that is, it is the space $\left(X^{\prime}_b\right)^{\prime}_b.$ If $X$ is a normed space, then $X^{\prime\prime}$ is the continuous dual space of the Banach space $X^{\prime}_b$ with its usual norm topology.

Definitions of the evaluation map and reflexive spaces

For any $x \in X,$ let $J_x : X^{\prime} \to \mathbb{F}$ be defined by $J_x\left(x^{\prime}\right) = x^{\prime}(x),$ where $J_x$ is a linear map called the evaluation map at $x$; since $J_x : X^{\prime}_b \to \mathbb{F}$ is necessarily continuous, it follows that $J_x \in \left(X^{\prime}_b\right)^{\prime}.$ Since $X^{\prime}$ separates points on $X,$ the linear map $J : X \to \left(X^{\prime}_b\right)^{\prime}$ defined by $J(x) := J_x$ is injective where this map is called the evaluation map or the canonical map. Call $X$ semi-reflexive if $J : X \to \left(X^{\prime}_b\right)^{\prime}$ is bijective (or equivalently, surjective) and we call $X$ reflexive if in addition $J : X \to X^{\prime\prime} = \left(X^{\prime}_b\right)^{\prime}_b$ is an isomorphism of TVSs. A normable space is reflexive if and only if it is semi-reflexive or equivalently, if and only if the evaluation map is surjective.

== Reflexive Banach spaces ==
Suppose $X$ is a normed vector space over the number field $\mathbb{F} = \R$ or $\mathbb{F} = \Complex$ (the real numbers or the complex numbers), with a norm $\|\,\cdot\,\|.$ Consider its dual normed space $X^{\prime},$ that consists of all continuous linear functionals $f : X \to \mathbb{F}$ and is equipped with the dual norm $\|\,\cdot\,\|^{\prime}$ defined by
$$\|f\|^{\prime} = \sup \{ |f(x)| \,:\, x \in X, \ \|x\| = 1 \}.$$

The dual $X^{\prime}$ is a normed space (a Banach space to be precise), and its dual normed space $X^{\prime\prime} = \left(X^{\prime}\right)^{\prime}$ is called bidual space for $X.$ The bidual consists of all continuous linear functionals $h : X^{\prime}\to \mathbb{F}$ and is equipped with the norm $\|\,\cdot\,\|^{\prime\prime}$ dual to $\|\,\cdot\,\|^{\prime}.$ Each vector $x \in X$ generates a scalar function $J(x) : X^{\prime} \to \mathbb{F}$ by the formula:
$$J(x)(f) = f(x) \qquad \text{ for all } f \in X^{\prime},$$
and $J(x)$ is a continuous linear functional on $X^{\prime},$ that is, $J(x)\in X^{\prime\prime}.$ One obtains in this way a map
$$J : X \to X^{\prime\prime}$$
called evaluation map, that is linear. It follows from the Hahn–Banach theorem that $J$ is injective and preserves norms:
$$\text{ for all } x \in X \qquad \|J(x)\|^{\prime\prime} = \|x\|,$$
that is, $J$ maps $X$ isometrically onto its image $J(X)$ in $X^{\prime\prime}.$ Furthermore, the image $J(X)$ is closed in $X^{\prime\prime},$ but it need not be equal to $X^{\prime\prime}.$

A normed space $X$ is called reflexive if it satisfies the following equivalent conditions:

1. the evaluation map $J : X \to X^{\prime\prime}$ is surjective,
2. the evaluation map $J : X \to X^{\prime\prime}$ is an isometric isomorphism of normed spaces,
3. the evaluation map $J : X \to X^{\prime\prime}$ is an isomorphism of normed spaces.

A reflexive space $X$ is a Banach space, since $X$ is then isometric to the Banach space $X^{\prime\prime}.$

=== Remark ===
A Banach space $X$ is reflexive if it is linearly isometric to its bidual under this canonical embedding $J.$ James' space is an example of a non-reflexive space which is linearly isometric to its bidual. Furthermore, the image of James' space under the canonical embedding $J$ has codimension one in its bidual. A Banach space $X$ is called quasi-reflexive (of order $d$) if the quotient $X^{\prime\prime} / J(X)$ has finite dimension $d.$

=== Examples ===
1. Every finite-dimensional normed space is reflexive, simply because in this case, the space, its dual and bidual all have the same linear dimension, hence the linear injection $J$ from the definition is bijective, by the rank–nullity theorem.
2. The Banach space $c_0$ of scalar sequences tending to 0 at infinity, equipped with the supremum norm, is not reflexive. It follows from the general properties below that $\ell^1$ and $\ell^{\infty}$ are not reflexive, because $\ell^1$ is isomorphic to the dual of $c_0$ and $\ell^{\infty}$ is isomorphic to the dual of $\ell^1.$
3. All Hilbert spaces are reflexive, as are the Lp spaces $L^p$ for $1 < p < \infty.$ More generally: all uniformly convex Banach spaces are reflexive according to the Milman–Pettis theorem. The $L^1(\mu)$ and $L^{\infty}(\mu)$ spaces are not reflexive (unless they are finite dimensional, which happens for example when $\mu$ is a measure on a finite set). Likewise, the Banach space $C([0, 1])$ of continuous functions on $[0, 1]$ is not reflexive.
4. The spaces $S_p(H)$ of operators in the Schatten class on a Hilbert space $H$ are uniformly convex, hence reflexive, when $1 < p < \infty.$ When the dimension of $H$ is infinite, then $S_1(H)$ (the trace class) is not reflexive, because it contains a subspace isomorphic to $\ell^1,$ and $S_{\infty}(H) = L(H)$ (the bounded linear operators on $H$) is not reflexive, because it contains a subspace isomorphic to $\ell^{\infty}.$ In both cases, the subspace can be chosen to be the operators diagonal with respect to a given orthonormal basis of $H.$

=== Properties ===
Since every finite-dimensional normed space is a reflexive Banach space, only infinite-dimensional spaces can be non-reflexive.

If a Banach space $Y$ is isomorphic to a reflexive Banach space $X$ then $Y$ is reflexive.

Every closed linear subspace of a reflexive space is reflexive. The continuous dual of a reflexive space is reflexive. Every quotient of a reflexive space by a closed subspace is reflexive.

Let $X$ be a Banach space. The following are equivalent.

1. The space $X$ is reflexive.
2. The continuous dual of $X$ is reflexive.
3. The closed unit ball of $X$ is compact in the weak topology. (This is known as Kakutani's Theorem.)
4. Every bounded sequence in $X$ has a weakly convergent subsequence.
5. The statement of Riesz's lemma holds when the real number (Note: The statement of Riesz's lemma involves only one real number, which is denoted by $\alpha$ in the article on Riesz's lemma. The lemma always holds for all real $\alpha < 1.$ But for a Banach space, the lemma holds for all $\alpha \leq 1$ if and only if the space is reflexive.) is exactly $1.$ Explicitly, for every closed proper vector subspace $Y$ of $X,$ there exists some vector $u \in X$ of unit norm $\|u\| = 1$ such that $\|u - y\| \geq 1$ for all $y \in Y.$
  - Using $d(u, Y) := \inf_{y \in Y} \|u - y\|$ to denote the distance between the vector $u$ and the set $Y,$ this can be restated in simpler language as: $X$ is reflexive if and only if for every closed proper vector subspace $Y,$ there is some vector $u$ on the unit sphere of $X$ that is always at least a distance of $1 = d(u, Y)$ away from the subspace.
  - For example, if the reflexive Banach space $X = \Reals^3$ is endowed with the usual Euclidean norm and $Y = \Reals \times \Reals \times \{0\}$ is the $x-y$ plane then the points $u = (0, 0, \pm 1)$ satisfy the conclusion $d(u, Y) = 1.$ If $Y$ is instead the $z$-axis then every point belonging to the unit circle in the $x-y$ plane satisfies the conclusion.
6. Every continuous linear functional on $X$ attains its supremum on the closed unit ball in $X.$ (James' theorem)

Since norm-closed convex subsets in a Banach space are weakly closed, it follows from the third property that closed bounded convex subsets of a reflexive space $X$ are weakly compact. Thus, for every decreasing sequence of non-empty closed bounded convex subsets of $X,$ the intersection is non-empty. As a consequence, every continuous convex function $f$ on a closed convex subset $C$ of $X,$ such that the set
$$C_t = \{ x \in C \,:\, f(x) \leq t \}$$
is non-empty and bounded for some real number $t,$ attains its minimum value on $C.$

The promised geometric property of reflexive Banach spaces is the following: if $C$ is a closed non-empty convex subset of the reflexive space $X,$ then for every $x \in X$ there exists a $c \in C$ such that $\|x - c\|$ minimizes the distance between $x$ and points of $C.$ This follows from the preceding result for convex functions, applied to$f(y) + \|y - x\|.$ Note that while the minimal distance between $x$ and $C$ is uniquely defined by $x,$ the point $c$ is not. The closest point $c$ is unique when $X$ is uniformly convex.

A reflexive Banach space is separable if and only if its continuous dual is separable. This follows from the fact that for every normed space $Y,$ separability of the continuous dual $Y^{\prime}$ implies separability of $Y.$

=== Super-reflexive space ===
Informally, a super-reflexive Banach space $X$ has the following property: given an arbitrary Banach space $Y,$ if all finite-dimensional subspaces of $Y$ have a very similar copy sitting somewhere in $X,$ then $Y$ must be reflexive. By this definition, the space $X$ itself must be reflexive. As an elementary example, every Banach space $Y$ whose two dimensional subspaces are isometric to subspaces of $X = \ell^2$ satisfies the parallelogram law, hence $Y$ is a Hilbert space, therefore $Y$ is reflexive. So $\ell^2$ is super-reflexive.

The formal definition does not use isometries, but almost isometries. A Banach space $Y$ is finitely representable in a Banach space $X$ if for every finite-dimensional subspace $Y_0$ of $Y$ and every $\epsilon > 0,$ there is a subspace $X_0$ of $X$ such that the multiplicative Banach–Mazur distance between $X_0$ and $Y_0$ satisfies
$$d\left(X_0, Y_0\right) < 1 + \varepsilon.$$

A Banach space finitely representable in $\ell^2$ is a Hilbert space. Every Banach space is finitely representable in $c_0.$ The Lp space $L^p([0, 1])$ is finitely representable in $\ell^p.$

A Banach space $X$ is super-reflexive if all Banach spaces $Y$ finitely representable in $X$ are reflexive, or, in other words, if no non-reflexive space $Y$ is finitely representable in $X.$ The notion of ultraproduct of a family of Banach spaces allows for a concise definition: the Banach space $X$ is super-reflexive when its ultrapowers are reflexive.

James proved that a space is super-reflexive if and only if its dual is super-reflexive.

=== Finite trees in Banach spaces ===
One of James' characterizations of super-reflexivity uses the growth of separated trees. The description of a vectorial binary tree begins with a rooted binary tree labeled by vectors: a tree of height $n$ in a Banach space $X$ is a family of $2^{n+1} - 1$ vectors of $X,$ that can be organized in successive levels, starting with level 0 that consists of a single vector $x_{\varnothing},$ the root of the tree, followed, for $k = 1, \ldots, n,$ by a family of $s^k$2 vectors forming level $k:$
$$\left\{ x_{\varepsilon_1, \ldots, \varepsilon_k} \right\}, \quad \varepsilon_j = \pm 1, \quad j = 1, \ldots, k,$$
that are the children of vertices of level $k - 1.$ In addition to the tree structure, it is required here that each vector that is an internal vertex of the tree be the midpoint between its two children:
$$x_\emptyset = \frac{x_1 + x_{-1}}{2}, \quad x_{\varepsilon_1, \ldots, \varepsilon_k} = \frac{x_{\varepsilon_1, \ldots, \varepsilon_k, 1} + x_{\varepsilon_1, \ldots, \varepsilon_k, -1}} {2}, \quad 1 \leq k < n.$$

Given a positive real number $t,$ the tree is said to be $t$-separated if for every internal vertex, the two children are $t$-separated in the given space norm:
$$\left\|x_1 - x_{-1}\right\| \geq t, \quad \left\|x_{\varepsilon_1, \ldots, \varepsilon_k, 1} - x_{\varepsilon_1, \ldots, \varepsilon_k, -1}\right\| \geq t, \quad 1 \leq k < n.$$

Theorem. The Banach space $X$ is super-reflexive if and only if for every $t \in (0, 2 \pi],$ there is a number $n(t)$ such that every $t$-separated tree contained in the unit ball of $X$ has height less than $n(t).$

Uniformly convex spaces are super-reflexive. Let $X$ be uniformly convex, with modulus of convexity $\delta_X$ and let $t$ be a real number in $(0, 2].$ By the properties of the modulus of convexity, a $t$-separated tree of height $n,$ contained in the unit ball, must have all points of level $n - 1$ contained in the ball of radius $1 - \delta_X(t) < 1.$ By induction, it follows that all points of level $n - k$ are contained in the ball of radius
$$\left(1 - \delta_X(t)\right)^j, \ j = 1, \ldots, n.$$

If the height $n$ was so large that
$$\left(1 - \delta_X(t)\right)^{n-1} < t / 2,$$
then the two points $x_1, x_{-1}$ of the first level could not be $t$-separated, contrary to the assumption. This gives the required bound $n(t),$ function of $\delta_X(t)$ only.

Using the tree-characterization, Enflo proved that super-reflexive Banach spaces admit an equivalent uniformly convex norm. Trees in a Banach space are a special instance of vector-valued martingales. Adding techniques from scalar martingale theory, Pisier improved Enflo's result by showing that a super-reflexive space $X$ admits an equivalent uniformly convex norm for which the modulus of convexity satisfies, for some constant $c > 0$ and some real number $q \geq 2,$
$$\delta_X(t) \geq c \, t^q, \quad \text{ whenever } t \in [0, 2].$$

== Reflexive locally convex spaces ==
The notion of reflexive Banach space can be generalized to topological vector spaces in the following way.

Let $X$ be a topological vector space over a number field $\mathbb F$ (of real numbers $\mathbb R$ or complex numbers $\Complex$). Consider its strong dual space $X^{\prime}_b,$ which consists of all continuous linear functionals $f : X \to \mathbb{F}$ and is equipped with the strong topology $b\left(X^{\prime}, X\right),$ that is,, the topology of uniform convergence on bounded subsets in $X.$ The space $X^{\prime}_b$ is a topological vector space (to be more precise, a locally convex space), so one can consider its strong dual space $\left(X^{\prime}_b\right)^{\prime}_b,$ which is called the strong bidual space for $X.$ It consists of all continuous linear functionals $h : X^{\prime}_b \to \mathbb{F}$ and is equipped with the strong topology $b\left(\left(X^{\prime}_b\right)^{\prime}, X^{\prime}_b\right).$ Each vector $x \in X$ generates a map $J(x) : X^{\prime}_b \to \mathbb{F}$ by the following formula:
$$J(x)(f) = f(x), \qquad f \in X^{\prime}.$$
This is a continuous linear functional on $X^{\prime}_b,$ that is,, $J(x) \in \left(X^{\prime}_b\right)^{\prime}_b.$ This induces a map called the evaluation map:
$$J : X \to \left(X^{\prime}_b\right)^{\prime}_b.$$
This map is linear. If $X$ is locally convex, from the Hahn–Banach theorem it follows that $J$ is injective and open (that is, for each neighbourhood of zero $U$ in $X$ there is a neighbourhood of zero $V$ in $\left(X^{\prime}_b\right)^{\prime}_b$ such that $J(U) \supseteq V \cap J(X)$). But it can be non-surjective and/or discontinuous.

A locally convex space $X$ is called

- semi-reflexive if the evaluation map $J : X \to \left(X^{\prime}_b\right)^{\prime}_b$ is surjective (hence bijective),
- reflexive if the evaluation map $J : X \to \left(X^{\prime}_b\right)^{\prime}_b$ is surjective and continuous (in this case $J$ is an isomorphism of topological vector spaces).

Theorem—A locally convex Hausdorff space $X$ is semi-reflexive if and only if $X$ with the $\sigma(X, X^*)$-topology has the Heine–Borel property (i.e. weakly closed and bounded subsets of $X$ are weakly compact).

Theorem—A locally convex space $X$ is reflexive if and only if it is semi-reflexive and barreled.

Theorem—The strong dual of a semireflexive space is barrelled.

Theorem—If $X$ is a Hausdorff locally convex space then the canonical injection from $X$ into its bidual is a topological embedding if and only if $X$ is infrabarreled.

=== Semireflexive spaces ===
==== Characterizations ====
If $X$ is a Hausdorff locally convex space then the following are equivalent:

1. $X$ is semireflexive;
2. The weak topology on $X$ had the Heine-Borel property (that is, for the weak topology $\sigma \left(X, X^{\prime}\right),$ every closed and bounded subset of $X_{\sigma}$ is weakly compact).
3. If linear form on $X^{\prime}$ that continuous when $X^{\prime}$ has the strong dual topology, then it is continuous when $X^{\prime}$ has the weak topology;
4. $X^{\prime}_{\tau}$ is barreled;
5. $X$ with the weak topology $\sigma\left(X, X^{\prime}\right)$ is quasi-complete.

=== Characterizations of reflexive spaces ===
If $X$ is a Hausdorff locally convex space then the following are equivalent:

1. $X$ is reflexive;
2. $X$ is semireflexive and infrabarreled;
3. $X$ is semireflexive and barreled;
4. $X$ is barreled and the weak topology on $X$ had the Heine-Borel property (that is, for the weak topology $\sigma\left(X, X^{\prime}\right),$ every closed and bounded subset of $X_{\sigma}$ is weakly compact).
5. $X$ is semireflexive and quasibarrelled.

If $X$ is a normed space then the following are equivalent:

1. $X$ is reflexive;
2. The closed unit ball is compact when $X$ has the weak topology $\sigma\left(X, X^{\prime}\right).$
3. $X$ is a Banach space and $X^{\prime}_b$ is reflexive.
4. Every sequence $\left(C_n\right)_{n=1}^{\infty},$ with $C_{n+1} \subseteq C_n$ for all $n$ of nonempty closed bounded convex subsets of $X$ has nonempty intersection.

Theorem—A real Banach space is reflexive if and only if every pair of non-empty disjoint closed convex subsets, one of which is bounded, can be strictly separated by a hyperplane.

James' theorem—A Banach space $B$ is reflexive if and only if every continuous linear functional on $B$ attains its supremum on the closed unit ball in $B.$

=== Sufficient conditions ===
Normed spaces

A normed space that is semireflexive is a reflexive Banach space. A closed vector subspace of a reflexive Banach space is reflexive.

Let $X$ be a Banach space and $M$ a closed vector subspace of $X.$ If two of $X, M,$ and $X / M$ are reflexive then they all are. This is why reflexivity is referred to as a three-space property.

Topological vector spaces

If a barreled locally convex Hausdorff space is semireflexive then it is reflexive.

The strong dual of a reflexive space is reflexive.Every Montel space is reflexive. And the strong dual of a Montel space is a Montel space (and thus is reflexive).

=== Properties ===
A locally convex Hausdorff reflexive space is barrelled. If $X$ is a normed space then $I : X \to X^{\prime \prime}$ is an isometry onto a closed subspace of $X^{\prime \prime}.$ This isometry can be expressed by:
$$\|x\| = \sup_{\stackrel{x^{\prime} \in X^{\prime},}{\| x^{\prime} \| \leq 1}} \left|\left\langle x^{\prime}, x \right\rangle\right|.$$

Suppose that $X$ is a normed space and $X^{\prime\prime}$ is its bidual equipped with the bidual norm. Then the unit ball of $X,$ $I(\{ x \in X : \|x\| \leq 1 \})$ is dense in the unit ball $\left\{ x^{\prime\prime} \in X^{\prime\prime} : \left\|x^{\prime\prime}\right\| \leq 1 \right\}$ of $X^{\prime\prime}$ for the weak topology $\sigma\left(X^{\prime\prime}, X^{\prime}\right).$

=== Examples ===
1. Every finite-dimensional Hausdorff topological vector space is reflexive, because $J$ is bijective by linear algebra, and because there is a unique Hausdorff vector space topology on a finite dimensional vector space.
2. A normed space $X$ is reflexive as a normed space if and only if it is reflexive as a locally convex space. This follows from the fact that for a normed space $X$ its dual normed space $X^{\prime}$ coincides as a topological vector space with the strong dual space $X^{\prime}_b.$ As a corollary, the evaluation map $J : X \to X^{\prime\prime}$ coincides with the evaluation map $J : X \to \left(X^{\prime}_b\right)^{\prime}_b,$ and the following conditions become equivalent:
  1. $X$ is a reflexive normed space (that is, $J : X \to X^{\prime\prime}$ is an isomorphism of normed spaces),
  2. $X$ is a reflexive locally convex space (that is, $J : X \to \left(X^{\prime}_b\right)^{\prime}_b$ is an isomorphism of topological vector spaces),
  3. $X$ is a semi-reflexive locally convex space (that is, $J : X \to \left(X^{\prime}_b\right)^{\prime}_b$ is surjective).
3. A (somewhat artificial) example of a semi-reflexive space that is not reflexive is obtained as follows: let $Y$ be an infinite dimensional reflexive Banach space, and let $X$ be the topological vector space $\left(Y, \sigma\left(Y, Y^{\prime}\right)\right),$ that is, the vector space $Y$ equipped with the weak topology. Then the continuous dual of $X$ and $Y^{\prime}$ are the same set of functionals, and bounded subsets of $X$ (that is, weakly bounded subsets of $Y$) are norm-bounded, hence the Banach space $Y^{\prime}$ is the strong dual of $X.$ Since $Y$ is reflexive, the continuous dual of $X^{\prime} = Y^{\prime}$ is equal to the image $J(X)$ of $X$ under the canonical embedding $J,$ but the topology on $X$ (the weak topology of $Y$) is not the strong topology $\beta\left(X, X^{\prime}\right),$ that is equal to the norm topology of $Y.$
4. Montel spaces are reflexive locally convex topological vector spaces. In particular, the following functional spaces frequently used in functional analysis are reflexive locally convex spaces:
  - the space $C^\infty(M)$ of smooth functions on arbitrary (real) smooth manifold $M,$ and its strong dual space $\left(C^\infty\right)^{\prime}(M)$ of distributions with compact support on $M,$
  - the space $\mathcal{D}(M)$ of smooth functions with compact support on arbitrary (real) smooth manifold $M,$ and its strong dual space $\mathcal{D}^{\prime}(M)$ of distributions on $M,$
  - the space $\mathcal{O}(M)$ of holomorphic functions on arbitrary complex manifold $M,$ and its strong dual space $\mathcal{O}^{\prime}(M)$ of analytic functionals on $M,$
  - the Schwartz space $\mathcal{S}\left(\R^n\right)$ on $\R^n,$ and its strong dual space $\mathcal{S}^{\prime}\left(\R^n\right)$ of tempered distributions on $\R^n.$

=== Counter-examples ===
- There exists a non-reflexive locally convex TVS whose strong dual is reflexive.

== Other types of reflexivity ==
A stereotype space, or polar reflexive space, is defined as a topological vector space (TVS) satisfying a similar condition of reflexivity, but with the topology of uniform convergence on totally bounded subsets (instead of bounded subsets) in the definition of dual space $X^{\prime}.$ More precisely, a TVS $X$ is called polar reflexive or stereotype if the evaluation map into the second dual space
$$J : X \to X^{\star\star},\quad J(x)(f) = f(x),\quad x\in X,\quad f\in X^\star$$
is an isomorphism of topological vector spaces. Here the stereotype dual space $X^\star$ is defined as the space of continuous linear functionals $X^{\prime}$ endowed with the topology of uniform convergence on totally bounded sets in $X$ (and the stereotype second dual space $X^{\star\star}$ is the space dual to $X^{\star}$ in the same sense).

In contrast to the classical reflexive spaces the class Ste of stereotype spaces is very wide (it contains, in particular, all Fréchet spaces and thus, all Banach spaces), it forms a closed monoidal category, and it admits standard operations (defined inside of Ste) of constructing new spaces, like taking closed subspaces, quotient spaces, projective and injective limits, the space of operators, tensor products, etc. The category Ste have applications in duality theory for non-commutative groups.

Similarly, one can replace the class of bounded (and totally bounded) subsets in $X$ in the definition of dual space $X^{\prime},$ by other classes of subsets, for example, by the class of compact subsets in $X$ – the spaces defined by the corresponding reflexivity condition are called reflective, and they form an even wider class than Ste, but it is not clear (2012), whether this class forms a category with properties similar to those of Ste.

== See also ==
- Grothendieck space
  - A generalization which has some of the properties of reflexive spaces and includes many spaces of practical importance is the concept of Grothendieck space.
- Reflexive operator algebra
- Tsirelson space
- James space
