= Banach lattice =

Banach space with a compatible structure of a lattice

In the mathematical disciplines of in functional analysis and order theory, a Banach lattice (X,‖·‖) is a complete normed vector space with a lattice order, $\leq$, such that for all x, y ∈ X, the implication ${|x|\leq|y|}\Rightarrow{\|x\|\leq\|y\|}$ holds, where the absolute value |·| is defined as $|x| = x \vee -x := \sup\{x, -x\}\text{.}$

== Examples and constructions ==
Banach lattices are extremely common in functional analysis, and "every known example [in 1948] of a Banach space [was] also a vector lattice." In particular:

- ℝ, together with its absolute value as a norm, is a Banach lattice.
- Let X be a topological space, Y a Banach lattice and 𝒞(X,Y) the space of continuous bounded functions from X to Y with norm $\|f\|_{\infty} = \sup_{x \in X} \|f(x)\|_Y\text{.}$ Then 𝒞(X,Y) is a Banach lattice under the pointwise partial order: ${f \leq g}\Leftrightarrow(\forall x\in X)(f(x)\leq g(x))\text{.}$

Examples of non-lattice Banach spaces are now known; James' space is one such.

== Properties ==
The continuous dual space of a Banach lattice is equal to its order dual.

Every Banach lattice admits a continuous approximation to the identity.

== Abstract (L)-spaces ==
A Banach lattice satisfying the additional condition ${f,g\geq0}\Rightarrow\|f+g\|=\|f\|+\|g\|$ is called an abstract (L)-space. Such spaces, under the assumption of separability, are isomorphic to closed sublattices of L^{1}([0,1]). The classical mean ergodic theorem and Poincaré recurrence generalize to abstract (L)-spaces.

== See also ==
- Banach space – Normed vector space that is complete
- Normed vector lattice
- Riesz space – Partially ordered vector space, ordered as a lattice
- Lattice (order) – Set whose pairs have minima and maxima

== Bibliography ==
- Abramovich, Yuri A.; Aliprantis, C. D. (2002). An Invitation to Operator Theory. Graduate Studies in Mathematics. Vol. 50. American Mathematical Society. ISBN 0-8218-2146-6.
- Birkhoff, Garrett (1948). Lattice Theory. AMS Colloquium Publications 25 (Revised ed.). New York City: AMS. hdl:2027/iau.31858027322886 – via HathiTrust.
- Narici, Lawrence; Beckenstein, Edward (2011). Topological Vector Spaces. Pure and applied mathematics (Second ed.). Boca Raton, FL: CRC Press. ISBN 978-1584888666. OCLC 144216834.
- Schaefer, Helmut H.; Wolff, Manfred P. (1999). Topological Vector Spaces. GTM. Vol. 8 (Second ed.). New York, NY: Springer New York Imprint Springer. ISBN 978-1-4612-7155-0. OCLC 840278135.
