= Schwartz topological vector space =

In functional analysis and related areas of mathematics, Schwartz spaces are topological vector spaces (TVS) whose neighborhoods of the origin have a property similar to the definition of totally bounded subsets. These spaces were introduced by Alexander Grothendieck.

== Definition ==
A Hausdorff locally convex space X with continuous dual $X^{\prime}$, X is called a Schwartz space if it satisfies any of the following equivalent conditions:

1. For every closed convex balanced neighborhood U of the origin in X, there exists a neighborhood V of 0 in X such that for all real r > 0, V can be covered by finitely many translates of rU.
2. Every bounded subset of X is totally bounded and for every closed convex balanced neighborhood U of the origin in X, there exists a neighborhood V of 0 in X such that for all real r > 0, there exists a bounded subset B of X such that V ⊆ B + rU.

== Properties ==
Every quasi-complete Schwartz space is a semi-Montel space. Every Fréchet Schwartz space is a Montel space.

The strong dual space of a complete Schwartz space is an ultrabornological space.

== Examples and sufficient conditions ==
- Vector subspace of Schwartz spaces are Schwartz spaces.
- The quotient of a Schwartz space by a closed vector subspace is again a Schwartz space.
- The Cartesian product of any family of Schwartz spaces is again a Schwartz space.
- The weak topology induced on a vector space by a family of linear maps valued in Schwartz spaces is a Schwartz space if the weak topology is Hausdorff.
- The locally convex strict inductive limit of any countable sequence of Schwartz spaces (with each space TVS-embedded in the next space) is again a Schwartz space.

=== Counter-examples ===
Every infinite-dimensional normed space is not a Schwartz space.

There exist Fréchet spaces that are not Schwartz spaces and there exist Schwartz spaces that are not Montel spaces.

== See also ==
- Auxiliary normed space
- Montel space – Barrelled space where closed and bounded subsets are compact

== Bibliography ==
- Bourbaki, Nicolas (1950). "Sur certains espaces vectoriels topologiques". Annales de l'Institut Fourier (in French). 2: 5–16 (1951). doi:10.5802/aif.16. MR 0042609.
- Bourbaki, Nicolas (1987) [1981]. Topological Vector Spaces: Chapters 1–5. Éléments de mathématique. Translated by Eggleston, H.G.; Madan, S. Berlin New York: Springer-Verlag. ISBN 3-540-13627-4. OCLC 17499190.
- Robertson, Alex P.; Robertson, Wendy J. (1980). Topological Vector Spaces. Cambridge Tracts in Mathematics. Vol. 53. Cambridge England: Cambridge University Press. ISBN 978-0-521-29882-7. OCLC 589250.
- Husain, Taqdir; Khaleelulla, S. M. (1978). Barrelledness in Topological and Ordered Vector Spaces. Lecture Notes in Mathematics. Vol. 692. Berlin, New York, Heidelberg: Springer-Verlag. ISBN 978-3-540-09096-0. OCLC 4493665.
- Jarchow, Hans (1981). Locally convex spaces. Stuttgart: B.G. Teubner. ISBN 978-3-519-02224-4. OCLC 8210342.
- Khaleelulla, S. M. (1982). Counterexamples in Topological Vector Spaces. Lecture Notes in Mathematics. Vol. 936. Berlin, Heidelberg, New York: Springer-Verlag. ISBN 978-3-540-11565-6. OCLC 8588370.
- Narici, Lawrence; Beckenstein, Edward (2011). Topological Vector Spaces. Pure and applied mathematics (Second ed.). Boca Raton, FL: CRC Press. ISBN 978-1584888666. OCLC 144216834.
- Schaefer, Helmut H.; Wolff, Manfred P. (1999). Topological Vector Spaces. GTM. Vol. 8 (Second ed.). New York, NY: Springer New York Imprint Springer. ISBN 978-1-4612-7155-0. OCLC 840278135.
- Trèves, François (2006) [1967]. Topological Vector Spaces, Distributions and Kernels. Mineola, N.Y.: Dover Publications. ISBN 978-0-486-45352-1. OCLC 853623322.
