= List of functional analysis topics =

This is a list of functional analysis topics.

See also: Glossary of functional analysis.

== Hilbert space ==
- Bra–ket notation
- Definite bilinear form
- Direct integral
- Euclidean space
- Fundamental theorem of Hilbert spaces
- Gram–Schmidt process
- Hellinger–Toeplitz theorem
- Hilbert space
- Inner product space
- Legendre polynomials
- Matrices
- Mercer's theorem
- Min-max theorem
- Normal vector
- Orthonormal basis
- Orthogonal complement
- Orthogonalization
- Parallelogram law
  - Normal matrix, normal operator
  - Orthogonal matrix
  - Unitary matrix
- Semi-Hilbert space
  - Diagonal matrix
  - Eigenvector, eigenvalue, eigenfunction
  - Hermitian operator self-adjoint operator, Hermitian adjoint
  - Hilbert matrix
  - Shift operator
  - Symmetric matrix
- Parseval's identity
- Rayleigh quotient
- Reproducing kernel Hilbert space
- Riesz representation theorem
- Rigged Hilbert space
- Spectral theorem, Spectral theory
- Trace class

== Functional analysis, classic results ==
- Normed vector space
- Unit ball
- Banach space
- Hahn–Banach theorem
- Dual space
- Predual
- Weak topology
- Reflexive space
- Polynomially reflexive space
- Baire category theorem
- Open mapping theorem (functional analysis)
- Closed graph theorem
- Uniform boundedness principle
- Arzelà–Ascoli theorem
- Banach–Alaoglu theorem
- Measure of non-compactness
- Banach–Mazur theorem

== Operator theory ==
- Bounded linear operator
  - Continuous linear extension
  - Compact operator
  - Approximation property
  - Invariant subspace
- Spectral theory
  - Spectrum of an operator
  - Essential spectrum
  - Spectral density
- Topologies on the set of operators on a Hilbert space
  - norm topology
  - ultrastrong topology
  - strong operator topology
  - weak operator topology
  - weak-star operator topology
  - ultraweak topology
- Singular value (or S-number)
- Fredholm operator
- Fuglede's theorem
- Compression (functional analysis)
- Friedrichs extension
- Stone's theorem on one-parameter unitary groups
- Stone–von Neumann theorem
- Functional calculus
  - Continuous functional calculus
  - Borel functional calculus
- Hilbert–Pólya conjecture

== Banach space examples ==
- Lp space
- Hardy space
- Sobolev space
- Tsirelson space
- ba space

== Real and complex algebras ==
- Uniform norm
- Matrix norm
- Spectral radius
- Normed division algebra
- Stone–Weierstrass theorem
- Banach algebra
- *-algebra
- B*-algebra
- C*-algebra
  - Universal C*-algebra
  - Spectrum of a C*-algebra
- Positive element
- Positive linear functional
- operator algebra
  - nest algebra
  - reflexive operator algebra
  - Calkin algebra
- Gelfand representation
- Gelfand–Naimark theorem
- Gelfand–Naimark–Segal construction
- Von Neumann algebra
  - Abelian von Neumann algebra
- von Neumann double commutant theorem
  - Commutant, bicommutant
- Topological ring
- Noncommutative geometry
- Disk algebra
- Colombeau algebra

== Topological vector spaces ==
- Barrelled space
- Bornological space
- Bourbaki–Alaoglu theorem
- Dual pair
- F-space
- Fréchet space
- Krein–Milman theorem
- Locally convex topological vector space
- Mackey topology
- Mackey–Arens theorem
- Montel space
- Polar set
- Polar topology
- Seminorm

== Amenability ==
- Amenable group
- Von Neumann conjecture

== Wavelets ==
- Basis function
- Daubechies wavelet
- Haar wavelet
- Morlet wavelet
- Mexican hat wavelet
- Complex Mexican hat wavelet
- Hermitian wavelet
- Discrete wavelet transform
- Continuous wavelet
- Continuous wavelet transform

== Quantum theory ==
See also list of mathematical topics in quantum theory

- Mathematical formulation of quantum mechanics
- Observable
- Operator (physics)
- Quantum state
  - Pure state
  - Fock state, Fock space
  - Density state
  - Coherent state
- Heisenberg picture
- Density matrix
- Quantum logic
- Quantum operation
- Wightman axioms

== Probability ==
- Free probability
- Bernstein's theorem

== Non-linear ==
- Fixed-point theorems in infinite-dimensional spaces

== History ==
- Stefan Banach (1892–1945)
- Hugo Steinhaus (1887–1972)
- John von Neumann (1903-1957)
- Alain Connes (born 1947)
- Earliest Known Uses of Some of the Words of Mathematics: Calculus & Analysis
- Earliest Known Uses of Some of the Words of Mathematics: Matrices and Linear Algebra
