= Von Neumann bicommutant theorem =

Theorem on bounded operators on a Hilbert space

In mathematics, specifically functional analysis, the von Neumann bicommutant theorem relates the closure of a set of bounded operators on a Hilbert space in certain topologies to the bicommutant of that set. In essence, it is a connection between the algebraic and topological sides of operator theory.

The formal statement of the theorem is as follows:

Von Neumann bicommutant theorem. Let M be an algebra consisting of bounded operators on a Hilbert space H, containing the identity operator, and closed under taking adjoints. Then the closures of M in the weak operator topology and the strong operator topology are equal, and are in turn equal to the bicommutant M′′ of M.

This algebra is called the von Neumann algebra generated by M.

There are several other topologies on the space of bounded operators, and one can ask what are the *-algebras closed in these topologies. If M is closed in the norm topology then it is a C*-algebra, but not necessarily a von Neumann algebra. One such example is the C*-algebra of compact operators (on an infinite dimensional Hilbert space). For most other common topologies the closed *-algebras containing 1 are von Neumann algebras; this applies in particular to the weak operator, strong operator, *-strong operator, ultraweak, ultrastrong, and *-ultrastrong topologies.

It is related to the Jacobson density theorem.

== Proof ==
Let H be a Hilbert space and L(H) the bounded operators on H. Consider a self-adjoint unital subalgebra M of L(H) (this means that M contains the adjoints of its members, and the identity operator on H).

The theorem is equivalent to the combination of the following three statements:

(i) cl_{W}(M) ⊆ M′′
(ii) cl_{S}(M) ⊆ cl_{W}(M)
(iii) M′′ ⊆ cl_{S}(M)

where the W and S subscripts stand for closure in the weak and strong operator topologies, respectively.

=== Proof of (i) ===
For any x and y in H, the map T → <Tx, y> is continuous in the weak operator topology, by its definition. Therefore, for any fixed operator O, so is the map

$$T \to \langle (OT - TO)x, y\rangle = \langle Tx, O^*y\rangle - \langle TOx, y\rangle$$

Let S be any subset of L(H), and S′ its commutant. For any operator T in S′, this function is zero for all O in S. For any T not in S′, it must be nonzero for some O in S and some x and y in H. By its continuity there is an open neighborhood of T for the weak operator topology on which it is nonzero, and which therefore is also not in S′. Hence any commutant S′ is closed in the weak operator topology. In particular, so is M′′; since it contains M, it also contains its weak operator closure.

=== Proof of (ii) ===
This follows directly from the weak operator topology being coarser than the strong operator topology: for every point x in cl_{S}(M), every open neighborhood of x in the weak operator topology is also open in the strong operator topology and therefore contains a member of M; therefore x is also a member of cl_{W}(M).

=== Proof of (iii) ===
Fix X ∈ M′′. We must show that X ∈ cl_{S}(M), i.e. for each h ∈ H and any ε > 0, there exists T in M with ||Xh − Th|| < ε.

Fix h in H. The cyclic subspace Mh = {Mh : M ∈ M} is invariant under the action of any T in M. Its closure cl(Mh) in the norm of H is a closed linear subspace, with corresponding orthogonal projection P : H → cl(Mh) in L(H). In fact, this P is in M′, as we now show.

Lemma. P ∈ M′.

Proof. Fix x ∈ H. As Px ∈ cl(Mh), it is the limit of a sequence O_{n}h with O_{n} in M. For any T ∈ M, TO_{n}h is also in Mh, and by the continuity of T, this sequence converges to TPx. So TPx ∈ cl(Mh), and hence PTPx = TPx. Since x was arbitrary, we have PTP = TP for all T in M.

Since M is closed under the adjoint operation and P is self-adjoint, for any x, y ∈ H we have

$$\langle x,TPy\rangle = \langle x,PTPy\rangle = \langle (PTP)^*x,y\rangle = \langle PT^*Px,y\rangle = \langle T^*Px,y\rangle = \langle Px,Ty\rangle = \langle x,PTy\rangle$$

So TP = PT for all T ∈ M, meaning P lies in M′.

By definition of the bicommutant, we must have XP = PX. Since M is unital, h ∈ Mh, and so h = Ph. Hence Xh = XPh = PXh ∈ cl(Mh). So for each ε > 0, there exists T in M with ||Xh − Th|| < ε, i.e. X is in the strong operator closure of M.

=== Non-unital case ===
A C*-algebra M acting on H is said to act non-degenerately if for h in H, Mh = {0} implies h = 0. In this case, it can be shown using an approximate identity in M that the identity operator I lies in the strong closure of M. Therefore, the conclusion of the bicommutant theorem holds for M.
