= Glossary of functional analysis =

This is a glossary for the terminology in a mathematical field of functional analysis.

Throughout the article, unless stated otherwise, the base field of a vector space is the field of real numbers or that of complex numbers. Algebras are not assumed to be unital.

See also: List of Banach spaces, glossary of real and complex analysis.

== * ==
*
*-homomorphism between involutive Banach algebras is an algebra homomorphism preserving *.

== A ==
abelian
Synonymous with "commutative"; e.g., an abelian Banach algebra means a commutative Banach algebra.
Anderson–Kadec
The Anderson–Kadec theorem says a separable infinite-dimensional Fréchet space is isomorphic to $\mathbb{R}^{\mathbb{N}}$.
Alaoglu
Alaoglu's theorem states that the closed unit ball in a normed space is compact in the weak-* topology.
adjoint
The adjoint of a bounded linear operator $T: H_1 \to H_2$ between Hilbert spaces is the bounded linear operator $T^* : H_2 \to H_1$ such that $\langle Tx, y \rangle = \langle x, T^* y \rangle$ for each $x \in H_1, y \in H_2$.
approximate identity
In a not-necessarily-unital Banach algebra, an approximate identity is a sequence or a net $\{ u_i \}$ of elements such that $u_i x \to x, x u_i \to x$ as $i \to \infty$ for each x in the algebra.
approximation property
A Banach space is said to have the approximation property if every compact operator is a limit of finite-rank operators.

== B ==
Baire
The Baire category theorem states that a complete metric space is a Baire space; if $U_i$ is a sequence of open dense subsets, then $\cap_1^{\infty} U_i$ is dense.
Banach
1. A Banach space is a normed vector space that is complete as a metric space.
2. A Banach algebra is a Banach space that has a structure of a possibly non-unital associative algebra such that

$\|x y \| \le \|x\| \|y\|$ for every $x, y$ in the algebra.

3. A Banach disc is a continuous linear image of a unit ball in a Banach space.
balanced
A subset S of a vector space over real or complex numbers is balanced if $\lambda S \subset S$ for every scalar $\lambda$ of length at most one.
barrel
1. A barrel in a topological vector space is a subset that is closed, convex, balanced and absorbing.
2. A topological vector space is barrelled if every barrel is a neighborhood of zero (that is, contains an open neighborhood of zero).
Bessel
Bessel's inequality states: given an orthonormal set S and a vector x in a Hilbert space,

$\sum_{u \in S} |\langle x, u \rangle|^2 \le \|x\|^2$,

where the equality holds if and only if S is an orthonormal basis; i.e., maximal orthonormal set.
bipolar
bipolar theorem.
bounded
A bounded operator is a linear operator between Banach spaces for which the image of the unit ball is bounded.
bornological
A bornological space.
Birkhoff orthogonality
Two vectors x and y in a normed linear space are said to be Birkhoff orthogonal if $\| x + \lambda y \| \ge \|x\|$ for all scalars λ. If the normed linear space is a Hilbert space, then it is equivalent to the usual orthogonality.
Borel
Borel functional calculus

== C ==
c
c space.
Calkin
The Calkin algebra on a Hilbert space is the quotient of the algebra of all bounded operators on the Hilbert space by the ideal generated by compact operators.
Cauchy–Schwarz inequality
The Cauchy–Schwarz inequality states: for each pair of vectors $x, y$ in an inner-product space,

$$|\langle x, y \rangle| \le \|x\| \|y\|$$.

Centraliser
1. The centraliser of an algebra A on which a weight w is defined is the subset K of A such that for a, b in K, w(ab)=w(ba), finite - i.e. w behaves like a trace on K.
Centre
1. The centre Z of an algebra A is the subset of A which elements commute with all elements of A.
Closed
1. The closed graph theorem states that a linear operator between Banach spaces is continuous (bounded) if and only if it has closed graph.
2. A closed operator is a linear operator whose graph is closed.
3. The closed range theorem says that a densely defined closed operator has closed image (range) if and only if the transpose of it has closed image.
Commutant
1. The commutant of a subset S of an algebra A is the subalgebra of the elements of A commuting with each element of S and is denoted by $S'$.
2. The von Neumann double commutant theorem states that a nondegenerate *-algebra $\mathfrak{M}$ of operators on a Hilbert space is a von Neumann algebra (i.e. is closed in the weak operator topology) if and only if $\mathfrak{M}'' = \mathfrak{M}$. Taking the double commutant is often a convenient way to build a weak closure - but one has to be explicit on the complete algebra A that is considered in the procedure.
Compact
A compact operator is a linear operator between Banach spaces for which the image of the unit ball is precompact.
Connes
Connes fusion.
C*
A C*-algebra is an involutive Banach algebra satisfying $\|x^* x\| = \|x^*\| \|x\|$. It is closed in the operator norm topology. Von Neumann algebras that are closed in the weak operator topology are particular C*-algebras.
Convex
A locally convex space is a topological vector space whose topology is generated by convex subsets.
Cyclic
Given a representation $(\pi, V)$ of a Banach algebra $A$, a cyclic vector is a vector $v \in V$ such that $\pi(A)v$ is dense in $V$.

== D ==
dilation
dilation (operator theory).
direct
Philosophically, a direct integral is a continuous analog of a direct sum.
Douglas
Douglas' lemma
Dunford
Dunford–Schwartz theorem
dual
1. The continuous dual of a topological vector space is the vector space of all the continuous linear functionals on the space.
2. The algebraic dual of a topological vector space is the dual vector space of the underlying vector space.

== E ==
Eidelheit
A theorem of Eidelheit.
essentially selfadjoint
An essentially selfadjoint operator.

== F ==
factor
A factor is a von Neumann algebra with trivial center.
faithful
A linear functional $\omega$ on an involutive algebra is faithful if $\omega(x^*x) \ne 0$ for each nonzero element $x$ in the algebra.
Fréchet
A Fréchet space is a topological vector space whose topology is given by a countable family of seminorms (which makes it a metric space) and that is complete as a metric space.
Fredholm
A Fredholm operator is a bounded operator such that it has closed range and the kernels of the operator and the adjoint have finite-dimension.

== G ==
Gelfand
1. The Gelfand–Mazur theorem states that a Banach algebra that is a division ring is the field of complex numbers.
2. The Gelfand representation of a commutative Banach algebra $A$ with spectrum $\Omega(A)$ is the algebra homomorphism $F: A \to C_0(\Omega(A))$, where $C_0(X)$ denotes the algebra of continuous functions on $X$ vanishing at infinity, that is given by $F(x)(\omega) = \omega(x)$. It is a *-preserving isometric isomorphism if $A$ is a commutative C*-algebra.
Grothendieck
1. Grothendieck's inequality.
2. Grothendieck's factorization theorem.

== H ==
Hahn–Banach
The Hahn–Banach theorem states: given a linear functional $\ell$ on a subspace of a complex vector space V, if the absolute value of $\ell$ is bounded above by a seminorm on V, then it extends to a linear functional on V still bounded by the seminorm. Geometrically, it is a generalization of the hyperplane separation theorem.
Heine
A topological vector space is said to have the Heine–Borel property if every closed and bounded subset is compact. Riesz's lemma says a Banach space with the Heine–Borel property must be finite-dimensional.
Hilbert
1. A Hilbert space is an inner product space that is complete as a metric space.
2. In the Tomita–Takesaki theory, a (left or right) Hilbert algebra is a certain algebra with an involution.
Hilbert–Schmidt
1. The Hilbert–Schmidt norm of a bounded operator $T$ on a Hilbert space is $\sum_i \|T e_i \|^2$ where $\{ e_i \}$ is an orthonormal basis of the Hilbert space.
2. A Hilbert–Schmidt operator is a bounded operator with finite Hilbert–Schmidt norm.

== I ==
index
1. The index of a Fredholm operator $T : H_1 \to H_2$ is the integer $\operatorname{dim}(\operatorname{ker}(T^*)) - \operatorname{dim}(\operatorname{ker}(T))$.
2. The Atiyah–Singer index theorem.
index group
The index group of a unital Banach algebra is the quotient group $G(A)/G_0(A)$ where $G(A)$ is the unit group of A and $G_0(A)$ the identity component of the group.
infra-barrelled
infra-barrelled
inner product
1. An inner product on a real or complex vector space $V$ is a function $\langle \cdot, \cdot \rangle : V \times V \to \mathbb{R}$ such that for each $v, w \in V$, (1) $x \mapsto \langle x, v \rangle$ is linear and (2) $\langle v, w \rangle = \overline{\langle w, v\rangle}$ where the bar means complex conjugate.
2. An inner product space is a vector space equipped with an inner product.
involution
1. An involution of a Banach algebra A is an isometric endomorphism $A \to A, \, x \mapsto x^*$ that is conjugate-linear and such that $(xy)^* = (yx)^*$.
2. An involutive Banach algebra is a Banach algebra equipped with an involution.
isometry
A linear isometry between normed vector spaces is a linear map preserving norm.

== K ==
Kato–Rellich
The Kato–Rellich theorem
Köthe
A Köthe sequence space. For now, see https://mathoverflow.net/questions/361048/on-k%C3%B6the-sequence-spaces
Krein–Milman
The Krein–Milman theorem states: a nonempty compact convex subset of a locally convex space has an extremal point.
Krein–Smulian
Krein–Smulian theorem

== L ==
Linear
Linear Operators is a three-value book by Dunford and Schwartz.
Locally convex algebra
A locally convex algebra is an algebra whose underlying vector space is a locally convex space and whose multiplication is continuous with respect to the locally convex space topology.

== M ==
Mazur
Mazur–Ulam theorem.
Montel
Montel space.

== N ==
nondegenerate
A representation $(\pi, V)$ of an algebra $A$ is said to be nondegenerate if for each vector $v \in V$, there is an element $a \in A$ such that $\pi(a) v \ne 0$.
noncommutative
1. noncommutative integration
2. noncommutative torus
norm
1. A norm on a vector space X is a real-valued function $\| \cdot \| : X \to \mathbb{R}$ such that for each scalar $a$ and vectors $x, y$ in $X$, (1) $\| ax\| = |a| \| x \|$, (2) (triangular inequality) $\| x + y \| \le \| x \| + \| y \|$ and (3) $\| x \| \ge 0$ where the equality holds only for $x = 0$.
2. A normed vector space is a real or complex vector space equipped with a norm $\| \cdot \|$. It is a metric space with the distance function $d(x, y) = \| x - y \|$.
normal
An operator is normal if it and its adjoint commute.
nuclear
1. nuclear operator.
2. nuclear space.

== O ==
one
A one parameter group of a unital Banach algebra A is a continuous group homomorphism from $(\mathbb{R}, +)$ to the unit group of A.
open
The open mapping theorem says a surjective continuous linear operator between Banach spaces is an open mapping.
orthonormal
1. A subset S of a Hilbert space is orthonormal if, for each u, v in the set, $\langle u, v \rangle$ = 0 when $u \ne v$ and $= 1$ when $u = v$.
2. An orthonormal basis is a maximal orthonormal set (note: it is *not* necessarily a vector space basis.)
orthogonal
1. Given a Hilbert space H and a closed subspace M, the orthogonal complement of M is the closed subspace $M^{\bot} = \{ x \in H | \langle x, y \rangle = 0, y \in M \}$.
2. In the notations above, the orthogonal projection $P$ onto M is a (unique) bounded operator on H such that $P^2 = P, P^* = P, \operatorname{im}(P) = M, \operatorname{ker}(P) = M^{\bot}.$

== P ==
Parseval
Parseval's identity states: given an orthonormal basis S in a Hilbert space, $\| x \|^2 = \sum_{u \in S} |\langle x, u \rangle|^2$.
positive
A linear functional $\omega$ on an involutive Banach algebra is said to be positive if $\omega(x^* x) \ge 0$ for each element $x$ in the algebra.
predual
predual.
projection
An operator T is called a projection if it is an idempotent; i.e., $T^2 = T$.

== Q ==
quasitrace
Quasitrace.

== R ==
Radon
See Radon measure.
Riesz decomposition
Riesz decomposition.
Riesz's lemma
Riesz's lemma.
reflexive
A reflexive space is a topological vector space such that the natural map from the vector space to the second (topological) dual is an isomorphism.
resolvent
The resolvent of an element x of a unital Banach algebra is the complement in $\mathbb{C}$ of the spectrum of x.
Ryll-Nardzewski
Ryll-Nardzewski fixed-point theorem.

== S ==
Schauder
Schauder basis.
Schatten
Schatten class
selection
Michael selection theorem.
self-adjoint
A self-adjoint operator is a bounded operator whose adjoint is itself. More generally, a closed densely defined operator is called self-adjoint if it coincides with the adjoint including the domain.
semi-reflexive
A locally convex space is called semi-reflexive space if the canonical map to the second continuous dual is surjective.
separable
A separable Hilbert space is a Hilbert space admitting a finite or countable orthonormal basis.
spectrum
1. The spectrum of an element x of a unital Banach algebra is the set of complex numbers $\lambda$ such that $x - \lambda$ is not invertible.
2. The spectrum of a commutative Banach algebra is the set of all characters (a homomorphism to $\mathbb{C}$) on the algebra.
spectral
1. The spectral radius of an element x of a unital Banach algebra is $\sup_{\lambda} |\lambda|$ where the sup is over the spectrum of x.
2. The spectral mapping theorem states: if x is an element of a unital Banach algebra and f is a holomorphic function in a neighborhood of the spectrum $\sigma(x)$ of x, then $f(\sigma(x)) = \sigma(f(x))$, where $f(x)$ is an element of the Banach algebra defined via the Cauchy's integral formula.
state
A state is a positive linear functional of norm one.
Stone
Stone lemma.
symmetric
A linear operator T on a pre-Hilbert space is symmetric if $(Tx, y) = (x, Ty).$

== T ==
tensor product
1. See topological tensor product. Note it is still somewhat of an open problem to define or work out a correct tensor product of topological vector spaces, including Banach spaces.
2. A projective tensor product.
topological
1. A topological vector space is a vector space equipped with a topology such that (1) the topology is Hausdorff and (2) the addition $(x, y) \mapsto x + y$ as well as scalar multiplication $(\lambda, x) \mapsto \lambda x$ are continuous.
2. A linear map $f: E \to F$ is called a topological homomorphism if $f : E \to \operatorname{im}(f)$ is an open mapping.
3. A sequence $\cdots \to E_{n -1} \to E_n \to E_{n+1} \to \cdots$ is called topologically exact if it is an exact sequence on the underlying vector spaces and, moreover, each $E_n \to E_{n+1}$ is a topological homomorphism.

== U ==
ultraweak
ultraweak topology.
unbounded operator
An unbounded operator is a partially defined linear operator, usually defined on a dense subspace.
uniform boundedness principle
The uniform boundedness principle states: given a set of operators between Banach spaces, if $\sup_T |Tx| < \infty$, sup over the set, for each x in the Banach space, then $\sup_T \|T\| < \infty$.
unitary
1. A unitary operator between Hilbert spaces is an invertible bounded linear operator such that the inverse is the adjoint of the operator.
2. Two representations $(\pi_1, H_1), (\pi_2, H_2)$ of an involutive Banach algebra A on Hilbert spaces $H_1, H_2$ are said to be unitarily equivalent if there is a unitary operator $U: H_1 \to H_2$ such that $\pi_2(x) U = U \pi_1(x)$ for each x in A.

== V ==
von Neumann
1. A von Neumann algebra.
2. von Neumann's theorem.
3. Von Neumann's inequality.

== W ==
W*
A W*-algebra is a C*-algebra that admits a faithful representation on a Hilbert space such that the image of the representation is a von Neumann algebra.
