= Strong convergence =

In mathematics, strong convergence may refer to:

- The strong convergence of random variables of a probability distribution.
- The norm-convergence of a sequence in a Hilbert space (as opposed to weak convergence).
- The convergence of operators in the strong operator topology.
