= Uffe Haagerup =

Danish mathematician (1949–2015)

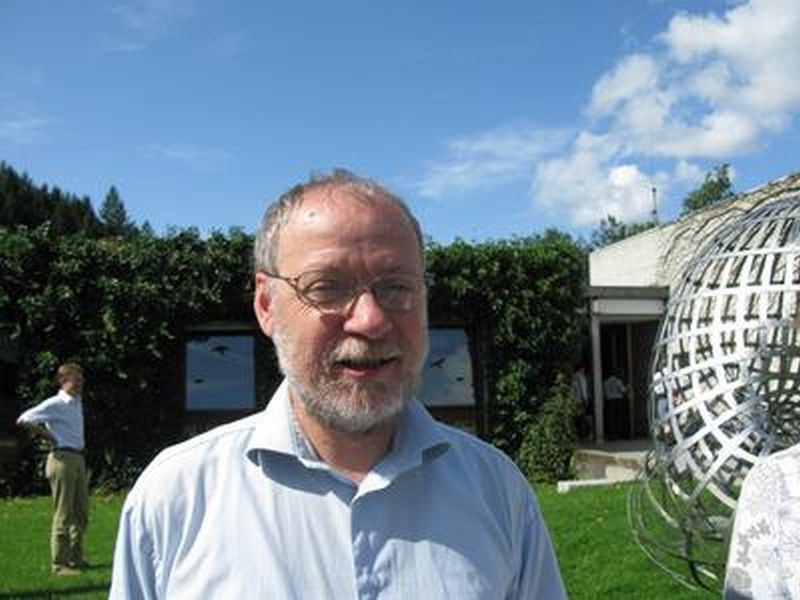
- 2008
- Born: Uffe Valentin Haagerup; 19 December 1949; Kolding, Denmark
- Died: 5 July 2015 (aged 65); Fåborg, Denmark
- Education: University of Copenhagen
- Known for: Haagerup property Christensen–Haagerup principle Haagerup tensor norm Haagerup subfactor Asaeda-Haagerup subfactor The Haagerup list
- Awards: Samuel Friedman Award; Ole Rømer Medal; Humboldt Research Award; European Research Council (Advanced Grant); European Latsis Prize
- Scientific career
- Fields: Mathematics
- Workplaces: University of Southern Denmark; University of Copenhagen
- Doctoral advisor: Gert K Pedersen

Uffe Valentin Haagerup (19 December 1949 – 5 July 2015) was a mathematician from Denmark.

== Biography ==
Uffe Haagerup was born in Kolding, but grew up on the island of Funen, in the small town of Fåborg. The field of mathematics had his interest from early on, encouraged and inspired by his older brother. In fourth grade Uffe was doing trigonometric and logarithmic calculations. He graduated as a student from Svendborg Gymnasium in 1968, whereupon he relocated to Copenhagen and immediately began his studies of mathematics and physics at the University of Copenhagen, again inspired by his older brother who also studied the same subjects at the same university. Early university studies in Einstein's general theory of relativity and quantum mechanics, sparked a lasting interest in the mathematical field of operator algebras, in particular von Neumann algebras and Tomita–Takesaki theory. In 1974 he received his Candidate's degree (cand. scient.) from the University of Copenhagen and in 1981 – at the age of 31 – Uffe was appointed at the University of Odense – now University of Southern Denmark, as the youngest professor of mathematics (dr. scient.) in the country at the time. Pregraduate summer schools at the university and later on extended professional research stays abroad, helped him discover and build a diverse and lasting international network of colleagues. Haagerup accidentally drowned on 5 July 2015, aged 65, while swimming in the Baltic Sea close to Fåborg where his family owned a cabin.

== Work ==
Uffe Haagerup's mathematical focus has been on the fields of operator algebra, group theory and geometry, but his publications has a broad scope and also involves free probability theory and random matrices. He has participated in many international mathematical groups and networks from early on, and has worked as ordinary contributor and participator, organizer, lecturer and editor.

Following his appointment as professor at Odense, Haagerup got acquainted with Vaughan Jones, when he did research in Philadelphia and later at the UCLA in Los Angeles. Jones inspired him to take up studies in and work on subfactor theory. Uffe Haagerup has done extensive work with fellow mathematician Alain Connes on von Neumann algebras. His solution to the so-called "Champagne Problem", secured him the Samuel Friedmann Award in April 1985, although it was first published in Acta Mathematica in 1987. Uffe considered this his best work. An early contact and collaboration was established with Swedish colleagues at the Mittag-Leffler Institute and the Norwegian group on operator algebra, where Uffe Haagerup has a long history of collaboration with Erling Størmer for example.

In the mathematical literature, Uffe Haagerup is known for the Haagerup property, the Haagerup subfactor, the Asaeda-Haagerup subfactor and the Haagerup list.

From 2000 to 2006 Uffe served as editor-in-chief of the journal Acta Mathematica. He was a member of the Royal Danish Academy of Sciences and Letters and the Norwegian Academy of Science and Letters. He worked at the Department of Mathematics at the University of Copenhagen from 2010 to 2014, where he was involved in the Centre for Symmetry and Deformation (SYM), but was appointed professor of mathematics in 2015 at the University of Southern Denmark in Odense.

== Prizes and honors ==
Uffe Haagerup received several awards and honours throughout his academic career. Amongst the most academically prestigious were the Danish Ole Rømer Medal, the international Humboldt Research Award and the European Latsis Prize.

- 1985. The Samuel Friedman Award (UCLA and Copenhagen)
- 1986. Invited speaker at ICM1986 (Berkeley)
- 1989. The Ole Rømer Medal (Copenhagen).
  The Ole Rømer Medal (est. 1944) is a Danish medal awarded by the University of Copenhagen and the municipality of Copenhagen, for outstanding research. It is considered amongst the most honourable scientific awards in the country, established in commemoration of Ole Rømer on his 300th anniversary.
- 2002. Plenary speaker at ICM2002 (Beijing)
- 2007. Distinguished lecturer at the Fields Institute of Mathematical Research (Toronto)
- 2008. The Humboldt Research Award (Münster)
- 2010–2014 European Research Council Advanced Grant
- 2012. Plenary speaker at International Congress on Mathematical Physics ICMP12 (Aalborg)
- 2012. 14th European Latsis Prize from the European Science Foundation, ESF (Brussels)
- 2013. Honorary Doctorate from East China Normal University, ECNU (Shanghai)

== Works (selection) ==
- Uffe Haagerup: Principal graphs and subfactors in the index range 4 < M:N < 3 + sqrt{2} ; pp. 1–38 in Subfactors – Proceedings of the Taniguchi Symposium Katata (1994).

== See also ==
- Approximately finite-dimensional C*-algebra
- Khintchine inequality
- Planar algebra
- Quasitrace

== Sources ==
- European Science Foundation (ESF): ESF awards 14th European Latsis Prize to Professor Uffe Haagerup for ground-breaking and important contributions to the theory of operator algebras 26 November 2012
- Curriculum Vitae (Uffe Haagerup) University of Copenhagen
- Jacob Hjelmborg: Interview with Uffe Haagerup, Matilde (2002), DMF Aarhus University (in Danish)
