= Bicommutant =

In algebra, the bicommutant of a subset S of a semigroup (such as an algebra or a group) is the commutant of the commutant of that subset. It is also known as the double commutant or second commutant and is written $S^{\prime \prime}$.

The bicommutant is particularly useful in operator theory, due to the von Neumann double commutant theorem, which relates the algebraic and analytic structures of operator algebras. Specifically, it shows that if M is a unital, self-adjoint operator algebra in the C*-algebra B(H), for some Hilbert space H, then the weak closure, strong closure and bicommutant of M are equal. This tells us that a unital C*-subalgebra M of B(H) is a von Neumann algebra if, and only if, $M = M^{\prime \prime}$, and that if not, the von Neumann algebra it generates is $M^{\prime \prime}$.

The bicommutant of S always contains S. So $S^{\prime \prime \prime} = \left(S^{\prime \prime}\right)^{\prime} \subseteq S^{\prime}$. On the other hand, $S^{\prime} \subseteq \left(S^{\prime}\right)^{\prime \prime} = S^{\prime \prime \prime}$. So $S^{\prime} = S^{\prime \prime \prime}$, i.e. the commutant of the bicommutant of S is equal to the commutant of S. By induction, we have:
$$S^{\prime} = S^{\prime \prime \prime} = S^{\prime \prime \prime \prime \prime} = \cdots = S^{2n-1} = \cdots$$
and
$$S \subseteq S^{\prime \prime} = S^{\prime \prime \prime \prime} = S^{\prime \prime \prime \prime \prime \prime} = \cdots = S^{2n} = \cdots$$
for n > 1.

It is clear that, if S_{1} and S_{2} are subsets of a semigroup,
$$\left( S_1 \cup S_2 \right)' = S_1 ' \cap S_2 ' .$$

If it is assumed that $S_1 = S_1'' \,$ and $S_2 = S_2''\,$ (this is the case, for instance, for von Neumann algebras), then the above equality gives
$$\left(S_1' \cup S_2'\right)'' = \left(S_1 '' \cap S_2 ''\right)' = \left(S_1 \cap S_2\right)' .$$

== See also ==
- von Neumann double commutant theorem
