= Jacobson density theorem =

Mathematical theorem

In mathematics, more specifically non-commutative ring theory, modern algebra, and module theory, the Jacobson density theorem is a theorem concerning simple modules over a ring R.

The theorem can be applied to show that any primitive ring can be viewed as a "dense" subring of the ring of linear transformations of a vector space. This theorem first appeared in the literature in 1945, in the famous paper "Structure Theory of Simple Rings Without Finiteness Assumptions" by Nathan Jacobson. This can be viewed as a kind of generalization of the Artin-Wedderburn theorem's conclusion about the structure of simple Artinian rings.

== Motivation and formal statement ==
Let R be a ring and let U be a simple right R-module. If u is a non-zero element of U, u • R = U (where u • R is the cyclic submodule of U generated by u). Therefore, if u, v are non-zero elements of U, there is an element of R that induces an endomorphism of U transforming u to v. The natural question now is whether this can be generalized to arbitrary (finite) tuples of elements. More precisely, find necessary and sufficient conditions on the tuple (x_{1}, ..., x_{n}) and (y_{1}, ..., y_{n}) separately, so that there is an element of R with the property that x_{i} • r = y_{i} for all i. If D is the set of all R-module endomorphisms of U, then Schur's lemma asserts that D is a division ring, and the Jacobson density theorem answers the question on tuples in the affirmative, provided that the x_{i} are linearly independent over D.

With the above in mind, the theorem may be stated this way:

The Jacobson density theorem. Let U be a simple right R-module, D = End_{R}(U), and X ⊂ U a finite and D-linearly independent set. If A is a D-linear transformation on U then there exists r ∈ R such that A(x) = x • r for all x in X.

== Proof ==
In the Jacobson density theorem, the right R-module U is simultaneously viewed as a left D-module where D = End(U_{R}), in the natural way: g • u = g(u). It can be verified that this is indeed a left module structure on U. As noted before, Schur's lemma proves D is a division ring if U is simple, and so U is a vector space over D.

The proof also relies on the following theorem proven in (Isaacs 1993) p. 185:

Theorem. Let U be a simple right R-module, D = End_{R}(U), and X ⊂ U a finite set. Write I = ann_{R}(X) for the annihilator of X in R. Let u be in U with u • I = 0. Then u is in XD; the D-span of X.

=== Proof of the Jacobson density theorem ===
We use induction on |X|. If X is empty, then the theorem is vacuously true and the base case for induction is verified.

Assume X is non-empty, let x be an element of X and write Y = X \{x}. If A is any D-linear transformation on U, by the induction hypothesis there exists s ∈ R such that A(y) = y • s for all y in Y. Write I = ann_{R}(Y). Now x • I is a submodule of U. If x • I = 0, then the previous theorem implies that x would be in the D-span of Y, contradicting the D-linear independence of X, therefore x • I ≠ 0. Since U is simple, we have: x • I = U. Since A(x) − x • s ∈ U = x • I, there exists i in I such that x • i = A(x) − x • s.

Define r = s + i and observe that for all y in Y we have:

$$\begin{align}
y \cdot r &= y \cdot(s + i) \\
&= y \cdot s + y \cdot i \\
&= y \cdot s && (\text{since } i\in \text{ann}_R(Y)) \\
&= A(y)
\end{align}$$

Now we do the same calculation for x:

$$\begin{align}
x \cdot r &= x \cdot (s + i) \\
&= x \cdot s + x \cdot i \\
&= x \cdot s + \left ( A(x) - x \cdot s \right )\\
&= A(x)
\end{align}$$

Therefore, A(z) = z • r for all z in X, as desired. This completes the inductive step of the proof. It follows now from mathematical induction that the theorem is true for finite sets X of any size.

== Topological characterization ==
A ring R is said to act densely on a simple right R-module U if it satisfies the conclusion of the Jacobson density theorem. There is a topological reason for describing R as "dense". Firstly, R can be identified with a subring of End_{D}(U) by identifying each element of R with the D linear transformation it induces by right multiplication. If U is given the discrete topology, and if U^{U} is given the product topology, and End_{D}(U) is viewed as a subspace of U^{U} and is given the subspace topology, then R acts densely on U if and only if R is dense set in End_{D}(U) with this topology.

== Consequences ==
The Jacobson density theorem has various important consequences in the structure theory of rings. Notably, the Artin–Wedderburn theorem's conclusion about the structure of simple right Artinian rings is recovered. The Jacobson density theorem also characterizes right or left primitive rings as dense subrings of the ring of D-linear transformations on some D-vector space U, where D is a division ring.

== Relations to other results ==
This result is related to the Von Neumann bicommutant theorem, which states that, for a *-algebra A of operators on a Hilbert space H, the double commutant A′′ can be approximated by A on any given finite set of vectors. In other words, the double commutant is the closure of A in the weak operator topology. See also the Kaplansky density theorem in the von Neumann algebra setting.
