= Polynomially reflexive space =

Type of Banach space in mathematics

In mathematics, a polynomially reflexive space is a Banach space X, on which the space of all polynomials in each degree is a reflexive space.

Given a multilinear functional M_{n} of degree n (that is, M_{n} is n-linear), we can define a polynomial p as

$$p(x)=M_n(x,\dots,x)$$

(that is, applying M_{n} on the diagonal) or any finite sum of these. If only n-linear functionals are in the sum, the polynomial is said to be n-homogeneous.

We define the space P_{n} as consisting of all n-homogeneous polynomials.

The P_{1} is identical to the dual space, and is thus reflexive for all reflexive X. This implies that reflexivity is a prerequisite for polynomial reflexivity.

== Relation to continuity of forms ==
On a finite-dimensional linear space, a quadratic form x↦f(x) is always a (finite) linear combination of products x↦g(x) h(x) of two linear functionals g and h. Therefore, assuming that the scalars are complex numbers, every sequence x_{n} satisfying g(x_{n}) → 0 for all linear functionals g, satisfies also f(x_{n}) → 0 for all quadratic forms f.

In infinite dimension the situation is different. For example, in a Hilbert space, an orthonormal sequence x_{n} satisfies g(x_{n}) → 0 for all linear functionals g, and nevertheless f(x_{n}) = 1 where f is the quadratic form f(x) = ||x||^{2}. In more technical words, this quadratic form fails to be weakly sequentially continuous at the origin.

On a reflexive Banach space with the approximation property the following two conditions are equivalent:

- every quadratic form is weakly sequentially continuous at the origin;
- the Banach space of all quadratic forms is reflexive.

Quadratic forms are 2-homogeneous polynomials. The equivalence mentioned above holds also for n-homogeneous polynomials, n=3,4,...

== Examples ==
For the $\ell^p$ spaces, the P_{n} is reflexive if and only if n < p. Thus, no $\ell^p$ is polynomially reflexive. ($\ell^\infty$ is ruled out because it is not reflexive.)

Thus if a Banach space admits $\ell^p$ as a quotient space, it is not polynomially reflexive. This makes polynomially reflexive spaces rare.

The Tsirelson space T* is polynomially reflexive.
