= Reflexive operator algebra =

In functional analysis, a reflexive operator algebra A is an operator algebra that has enough invariant subspaces to characterize it. Formally, A is reflexive if it is equal to the algebra of bounded operators which leave invariant each subspace left invariant by every operator in A.

This should not be confused with a reflexive space.

== Examples ==
Nest algebras are examples of reflexive operator algebras. In finite dimensions, these are simply algebras of all matrices of a given size whose nonzero entries lie in an upper-triangular pattern.

In fact if we fix any pattern of entries in an n by n matrix containing the diagonal, then the set of all n by n matrices whose nonzero entries lie in this pattern forms a reflexive algebra.

An example of an algebra which is not reflexive is the set of 2 × 2 matrices

$$\left\{
\begin{pmatrix}
a&b\\ 0 & a
\end{pmatrix}
\ :\  a,b\in\mathbb{C}\right\}.$$

This algebra is smaller than the Nest algebra

$$\left\{
\begin{pmatrix}
a&b\\ 0 & c
\end{pmatrix}
\ :\  a,b,c\in\mathbb{C}\right\}$$

but has the same invariant subspaces, so it is not reflexive.

If T is a fixed n by n matrix then the set of all polynomials in T and the identity operator forms a unital operator algebra. A theorem of Deddens and Fillmore states that this algebra is reflexive if and only if the largest two blocks in the Jordan normal form of T differ in size by at most one. For example, the algebra

$$\left\{
\begin{pmatrix}
a & b & 0\\ 0 & a & 0\\ 0 & 0 & a
\end{pmatrix}
\ :\  a,b\in\mathbb{C}\right\}$$

which is equal to the set of all polynomials in

$$T=\begin{pmatrix}
0 & 1 & 0\\ 0 & 0 & 0\\ 0 & 0 & 0
\end{pmatrix}$$

and the identity is reflexive.

== Hyper-reflexivity ==
Let $\mathcal{A}$ be a weak*-closed operator algebra contained in B(H), the set of all bounded operators on a Hilbert space H and for T any operator in B(H), let

$$\beta(T,\mathcal{A})=\sup \left\{ \left\| P^\perp TP \right\| \ :\ P\mbox{ is a projection and } P^\perp \mathcal{A} P = (0) \right\} .$$

Observe that P is a projection involved in this supremum precisely if the range of P is an invariant subspace of $\mathcal{A}$.

The algebra $\mathcal{A}$ is reflexive if and only if for every T in B(H):

$$\beta(T,\mathcal{A})=0 \mbox{ implies that } T \mbox{ is in } \mathcal{A} .$$

We note that for any T in B(H) the following inequality is satisfied:

$$\beta(T,\mathcal{A})\le \mbox{dist}(T,\mathcal{A}) .$$

Here $\mbox{dist}(T,\mathcal{A})$ is the distance of T from the algebra, namely the smallest norm of an operator T-A where A runs over the algebra. We call $\mathcal{A}$ hyperreflexive if there is a constant K such that for every operator T in B(H),

$$\mbox{dist}(T,\mathcal{A})\le K \beta(T,\mathcal{A}) .$$

The smallest such K is called the distance constant for $\mathcal{A}$. A hyper-reflexive operator algebra is automatically reflexive.

In the case of a reflexive algebra of matrices with nonzero entries specified by a given pattern, the problem of finding the distance constant can be rephrased as a matrix-filling problem: if we fill the entries in the complement of the pattern with arbitrary entries, what choice of entries in the pattern gives the smallest operator norm?

== Examples ==
- Every finite-dimensional reflexive algebra is hyper-reflexive. However, there are examples of infinite-dimensional reflexive operator algebras which are not hyper-reflexive.
- The distance constant for a one-dimensional algebra is 1.
- Nest algebras are hyper-reflexive with distance constant 1.
- Many von Neumann algebras are hyper-reflexive, but it is not known if they all are.
- A type I von Neumann algebra is hyper-reflexive with distance constant at most 2.

== See also ==
- Invariant subspace
- subspace lattice
- reflexive subspace lattice
- nest algebra
