= Nest algebra =

In functional analysis, a branch of mathematics, nest algebras are a class of operator algebras that generalise the upper-triangular matrix algebras to a Hilbert space context. They were introduced by Ringrose (1965).

== Definition ==
Nest algebras are formally defined as the algebra of bounded operators leaving invariant each subspace contained in a subspace nest, that is, a set of subspaces which is totally ordered by inclusion and is also a complete lattice. Since the orthogonal projections corresponding to the subspaces in a nest commute, nests are commutative subspace lattices. This makes them one of the simplest examples of commutative subspace lattice algebras.

== Examples ==
By way of an example, let us apply this definition to recover the finite-dimensional upper-triangular matrices. Let us work in the $n$-dimensional complex vector space $\mathbb{C}^n$, and let $e_1,e_2,\dots,e_n$ be the standard basis. For $j=0,1,2,\dots,n$, let $S_j$ be the $j$-dimensional subspace of $\mathbb{C}^n$ spanned by the first $j$ basis vectors $e_1,\dots,e_j$. Let

$$N=\{ (0)=S_0, S_1, S_2, \dots, S_{n-1}, S_n=\mathbb{C}^n \};$$

then N is a subspace nest, and the corresponding nest algebra of n × n complex matrices M leaving each subspace in N invariant – that is, satisfying $MS\subseteq S$ for each S in N – is precisely the set of upper-triangular matrices.

If we omit one or more of the subspaces S_{j} from N then the corresponding nest algebra consists of block upper-triangular matrices.

== Properties ==
Nest algebras are among the simplest examples of non-self-adjoint operator algebras. Furthermore, they are closed in the weak operator topology and hyperreflexive with distance constant 1.

== See also ==
- Flag manifold
