= Primitive ring =

In the branch of abstract algebra known as ring theory, a left primitive ring is a ring which has a faithful simple left module. Well known examples include endomorphism rings of vector spaces and Weyl algebras over fields of characteristic zero.

== Definition ==
A ring R is said to be a left primitive ring if it has a faithful simple left R-module. A right primitive ring is defined similarly with right R-modules. There are rings which are primitive on one side but not on the other. The first example was constructed by George M. Bergman in (Bergman 1964). Another example found by Jategaonkar showing the distinction can be found in Rowen (1988, p. 159).

An internal characterization of left primitive rings is as follows: a ring is left primitive if and only if there is a maximal left ideal containing no nonzero two-sided ideals. The analogous definition for right primitive rings is also valid.

The structure of left primitive rings is completely determined by the Jacobson density theorem: A ring is left primitive if and only if it is isomorphic to a dense subring of the ring of endomorphisms of a left vector space over a division ring.

Another equivalent definition states that a ring is left primitive if and only if it is a prime ring with a faithful left module of finite length (Lam 2001, Ex. 11.19, p. 191).

== Properties ==
One-sided primitive rings are both semiprimitive rings and prime rings. Since the product ring of two or more nonzero rings is not prime, it is clear that the product of primitive rings is never primitive.

For a left Artinian ring, it is known that the conditions "left primitive", "right primitive", "prime", and "simple" are all equivalent, and in this case it is a semisimple ring isomorphic to a square matrix ring over a division ring. More generally, in any ring with a minimal one sided ideal, "left primitive" = "right primitive" = "prime".

A commutative ring is left primitive if and only if it is a field.

Being left primitive is a Morita invariant property.

== Examples ==
Every simple ring R with unity is both left and right primitive. (However, a simple non-unital ring may not be primitive.) This follows from the fact that R has a maximal left ideal M, and the fact that the quotient module R/M is a simple left R-module, and that its annihilator is a proper two-sided ideal in R. Since R is a simple ring, this annihilator is {0} and therefore R/M is a faithful left R-module.

Weyl algebras over fields of characteristic zero are primitive, and since they are domains, they are examples without minimal one-sided ideals.

=== Full linear rings ===
A special case of primitive rings is that of full linear rings. A left full linear ring is the ring of all linear transformations of an infinite-dimensional left vector space over a division ring. (A right full linear ring differs by using a right vector space instead.) In symbols, $R=\mathrm{End}(_D V)$ where V is a vector space over a division ring D. It is known that R is a left full linear ring if and only if R is von Neumann regular, left self-injective with socle soc(_{R}R) ≠ {0}. Through linear algebra arguments, it can be shown that $\mathrm{End}(_D V)\,$ is isomorphic to the ring of row finite matrices $\mathbb{RFM}_I(D)\,$, where I is an index set whose size is the dimension of V over D. Likewise right full linear rings can be realized as column finite matrices over D.

Using this we can see that there are non-simple left primitive rings. By the Jacobson Density characterization, a left full linear ring R is always left primitive. When dim_{D}V is finite R is a square matrix ring over D, but when dim_{D}V is infinite, the set of finite rank linear transformations is a proper two-sided ideal of R, and hence R is not simple.

== See also ==
- primitive ideal
