= Ultrastrong topology =

In functional analysis, the ultrastrong topology, or σ-strong topology, or strongest topology on the set B(H) of bounded operators on a Hilbert space is the topology defined by the family of seminorms $p_\omega(x) = \omega(x^{*} x)^{1/2}$ for positive elements $\omega$ of the predual $L_{*}(H)$ that consists of trace class operators.

It was introduced by John von Neumann in 1936.

== Relation with the strong (operator) topology ==
The ultrastrong topology is similar to the strong (operator) topology. For example, on any norm-bounded set the strong operator and ultrastrong topologies are the same. The ultrastrong topology is stronger than the strong operator topology.

One problem with the strong operator topology is that the dual of B(H) with the strong operator topology is "too small". The ultrastrong topology fixes this problem: the dual is the full predual B_{*}(H) of all trace class operators. In general the ultrastrong topology is better than the strong operator topology, but is more complicated to define so people usually use the strong operator topology if they can get away with it.

The ultrastrong topology can be obtained from the strong operator topology as follows. If H_{1} is a separable infinite dimensional Hilbert space then B(H) can be embedded in B(H⊗H_{1}) by tensoring with the identity map on H_{1}. Then the restriction of the strong operator topology on B(H⊗H_{1}) is the ultrastrong topology of B(H). Equivalently, it is given by the family of seminorms $x \mapsto \left(\sum_{n=1}^\infty \|x\xi_n\|^2\right)^{1/2},$ where $\sum_{n=1}^\infty \|\xi_n\|^2 < \infty.$

The adjoint map is not continuous in the ultrastrong topology. There is another topology called the ultrastrong* topology, which is the weakest topology stronger than the ultrastrong topology such that the adjoint map is continuous.

== See also ==
- Strong operator topology – Locally convex topology on function spaces
- Topological tensor product – Tensor product constructions for topological vector spaces
- Topologies on the set of operators on a Hilbert space
- Ultraweak topology
