= Glossary of real and complex analysis =

This is a glossary of concepts and results in real analysis and complex analysis in mathematics. In particular, it includes those in measure theory (as there is no glossary for measure theory in Wikipedia right now). Also, the topics in algebraic analysis are included. However, the items in the theory of differential equations are not included.

See also: list of real analysis topics, list of complex analysis topics and glossary of functional analysis.

== 0–9 ==
$1 + 2 + 3 + \cdots = -\frac{1}{12}$
It means the value of the zeta function at $-1$ is $-1/12$. See 1 + 2 + 3 + 4 + ⋯.

== A ==
Abel
1. Abel sum
2. Abel integral
absolute
A series $\sum_0^{\infty} a_n$ is said to converge absolutely if $\sum_0^{\infty} |a_n| < \infty.$
accumulation
An accumulation point can mean either a limit point or a cluster point.
analytic capacity
analytic capacity.
analytic continuation
An analytic continuation of a holomorphic function is a unique holomorphic extension of the function (on a connected open subset of $\mathbb{C}$).
analytic sheaf
analytic sheaf
archimedean
The archimedean property of real numbers says: given two real numbers $x, y$, if $x > 0$, then there exists an integer $n > 0$ such that $nx > y$.
argument principle
argument principle
Ascoli
Ascoli's theorem says that an equicontinous bounded sequence of functions on a compact subset of $\mathbb{R}^n$ has a convergent subsequence with respect to the sup norm.

== B ==
Bargmann
Bargmann transform
Basel
The Basel problem says $\sum_1^{\infty} \frac{1}{n^2} = \frac{\pi^2}{6}.$
Berezin
Berezin integral
Bolzano
The Bolzano-Weierstrass theorem says a bounded sequence in $\mathbb{R}^n$ has a convergent subsequence. Today it is subsumed in the statement that a subset of a metric space is compact if and only if it is sequentially compact (i.e., every sequence has a convergent subsequence) and the Heine–Borel theorem.
Borel
1. A Borel measure is a measure whose domain is the Borel σ-algebra.
2. The Borel σ-algebra on a topological space is the smallest σ-algebra containing all open sets.
3. Borel's lemma says that a given formal power series, there is a smooth function whose Taylor series coincides with the given series.
4. The Borel–Lebesgue lemma is another name for the Heine-Borel theorem.
bounded
A subset $A$ of a metric space $(X,d)$ is bounded if there is some $C > 0$ such that $d(a,b) < C$ for all $a,b \in A$.
bump
A bump function is a nonzero compactly-supported smooth function, usually constructed using the exponential function.
BV
A BV-function or a bounded variation is a function with bounded total variation.

== C ==
Calderón
Calderón–Zygmund lemma
Cantor
Cantor set.
capacity
Capacity of a set is a notion in potential theory.
Carathéodory
1. Carathéodory's extension theorem
2. Carathéodory's criterion states a sufficient condition for Borel sets to be measurable.
Cartan
Cartan's theorems A and B.
Cartwright
Cartwright's theorem gives a bounded for a p-valent entire function.
Cauchy
1. The Cauchy–Riemann equations are a system of differential equations such that a function satisfying it (in the distribution sense) is a holomorphic function.
2. Cauchy integral formula.
3. Cauchy residue theorem.
4. Cauchy's estimate.
5. The Cauchy principal value is, when possible, a number assigned to a function when the function is not integrable.
6. On a metric space, a sequence $x_n$ is called a Cauchy sequence if $d(x_n, x_m) \to 0$; i.e., for each $\epsilon > 0$, there is an $N > 0$ such that $d(x_n, x_m) < \epsilon$ for all $n, m \ge N$.
7. Cauchy condensation test.
Cavalieri
Cavalieri's principle.
Cesàro
Cesàro summation is one way to compute a divergent series.
Clarke generalized derivative
Clarke generalized derivative.
cluster
1. A cluster point of a net $x_{\alpha}$ (or a sequence) is a point in $\bigcap_{\alpha} \overline{\{ x_{\beta} \mid \beta \gtrsim \alpha \} }$. The notion gives a convenient criterion for compactness: a space (resp. a metric space) is compact if and only if each net (resp. sequence) has a cluster point.
2. For a first countable space, a point is a cluster point of a sequence $x_i$ if and only if there is a subsequence converging to that point.
complex
1. A complex number is an element in $\mathbb{C} = \mathbb{R}[x]/(x^2+1)$, the quotient ring of a polynomial ring, where the image of the indeterminate $x$ is denoted by $i$. As a set, $\mathbb{C}$ can be identified with $\mathbb{R}^2$ and that gives a topology on it.
2. complex logarithm.
3. Given a function $f$ on an open set $U \subset \mathbb{C}$, the complex derivative of it is, if any, the limit $\lim_{\mathbb{C} \ni h \to 0} \frac{f(z+h) - f(z)}{h}$.
continuous
A function $f : X \to Y$ between metric spaces $(X,d_X)$ and $(Y,d_Y)$ is continuous if for any convergent sequence $x_n \to x$ in $X$, we have $f(x_n) \to f(x)$ in $Y$.
contour
The contour integral of a measurable function $f$ over a piece-wise smooth curve $\gamma : [0, 1] \to \mathbb{C}$ is $\int_{\gamma} f \, dz := \int_0^1 \gamma^*(f \, dz)$.
converge
1. A sequence $x_n$ in a topological space is said to converge to a point $x$ if for each open neighborhood $U$ of $x$, the set $\{ n \mid x_n \not\in U \}$ is finite.
2. A sequence $x_n$ in a metric space is said to converge to a point $x$ if for all $\epsilon > 0$, there exists an $N > 0$ such that for all $n > N$, we have $d(x_n,x) < \epsilon$.
3. A series $x_1 + x_2 + \cdots$ on a normed space (e.g., $\mathbb{R}^n$) is said to converge if the sequence of the partial sums $s_n := \sum_1^n x_j$ converges.
convolution
The convolution $f * g$ of two functions on a convex set is given by

$$(f * g)(x) = \int f(y - x)g(y) \, dy,$$

provided the integration converges.
Cousin
Cousin problems.
critical
critical point.
cutoff
For sets $F \subset U$, $F$ closed, $U$ open, a cutoff function is a function that is $1$ on $F$ and has support contained in $U$. It’s usually required to be continuous or smooth.

== D ==
de Branges
de Branges's theorem.
Dedekind
A Dedekind cut is one definition of a real number. By definition, it is a nonempty proper lower subset $\alpha$ of $\mathbb{Q}$ that has no maximal element, where lower means it contains $\{ q \in \mathbb{Q} \mid q < p \}$ for each $p$ in $\alpha$. For example, $\sqrt{2} = \{ p \in \mathbb{Q} \mid p < 0 \text{ or } p^2 < 2 \}$.
derivative
Given a map $f : E \to F$ between normed spaces, the derivative of $f$ at a point x is a (unique) linear map $T : E \to F$ such that $\lim_{h \to 0} \| f(x + h) - f(x) - Th \|/\|h\| = 0$.
differentiable
A map between normed space is differentiable at a point x if the derivative at x exists.
differentiation
Differentiation under the integral sign
Dini
Dini's theorem.
Dirac
1. The Dirac delta function $\delta_0$ on $\mathbb{R}^n$ is a distribution (so not exactly a function) given as $\langle \delta_0, \varphi \rangle = \varphi(0).$
2. A Dirac sequence.
distribution
A distribution is a type of a generalized function; precisely, it is a continuous linear functional on the space of test functions.
divergent
A divergent series is a series whose partial sum does not converge. For example, $\sum_1^{\infty} \frac{1}{n}$ is divergent.
division conjecture
The division conjecture of L. Schwartz (now a theorem) says a distribution divided by a real analytic function is again a distribution.
dominated
Lebesgue's dominated convergence theorem says $\int f_n \, d\mu$ converges to $\int f \, d\mu$ if $f_n$ is a sequence of measurable functions such that $f_n$ converges to $f$ pointwise and $|f_n| \le g$ for some integrable function $g$.

== E ==
e
Euler's number. One definition is through the series representation of the exponential function; namely, $e = \sum_0^{\infty} \frac{1}{n!}$. Another is through natural logarithm; namely, $\log(e) = 1$.
edge
Edge-of-the-wedge theorem.
Egoroff
Egoroff's theorem.
entire
An entire function is a holomorphic function whose domain is the entire complex plane.
equicontinuous
A set $S$ of maps between fixed metric spaces is said to be equicontinuous if for each $\epsilon > 0$, there exists a $\delta > 0$ such that $\sup_{f \in S} d(f(x), f(y)) < \epsilon$ for all $x, y$ with $d(x, y) < \delta$. A map $f$ is uniformly continuous if and only if $\{ f \}$ is equicontinuous.
Euler
The Euler–Maclaurin formula.
exponential
The exponential function is the function $z \mapsto e^z$ on the complex plane, where $e$ is Euler's number. If the number $e$ is defined through the exponential function, then the exponential function is defined more directly as: $z \mapsto \sum_1^{\infty} \frac{z^n}{n!}$.

== F ==
Fatou
Fatou's lemma
finite interesection property
Given a topological space $X$, a family $F$ of closed subsets of $X$ is said to have the finite intersection property if each finite subset of $F$ has nonempty intersection. Then saying $X$ is compact can be restated as: each family of closed subsets of $X$ with the finite intersection property has nonempty intersection.
filter
1. A filter $F$ on a set $X$ is a proper subset of the power set of $X$ such that

(upper) if $S$ is in $F$, each subset of $X$ containing $S$ is also in $F$ and
(downward directed) the intersection of each finite subset of $F$ is in $F$.

Its role is similar to that of nets but in analysis, nets are more commonly used.
2. Given a net $x_{\alpha}$, there is the filter $F$ determined by it; namely, the filter generated by the tails $\{ x_{\beta} \mid \beta \gtrsim \alpha \}$. Then for example, $x_{\alpha}$ converges to a point $x$ if and only if $F$ converges to $x$ (meaning $F$ contains every neighborhood of $x$). Conversely, given a filter, we can choose a net associated to it so that all the associated nets determine the original filter.
first
A first countable space is a topological space in which each point $x$ has a decreasing sequence of neighborhoods $x \in \cdots \subset U_2 \subset U_1 \subset U_0$ such that each neighborhood of $x$ contains some $U_n$. An important property of such a space is that a point is in the closure of a set $E$ if and only if there is a sequence in $E$ that converges to that point.
Fock
Fock space
Fourier
1. The Fourier transform of a function $f$ on $\mathbb{R}^n$ is: (provided it makes sense)

$$\widehat{f}(\xi) = \int f(x) e^{-2\pi i x \cdot \xi} \, dx.$$

2. The Fourier transform $\widehat{f}$ of a distribution $f$ is $\langle \widehat{f}, \varphi \rangle = \langle f, \widehat{\varphi} \rangle$. For example, $\widehat{\delta_0} = 1$ (Fourier's inversion formula).
Fubini
Fubini's theorem computes an integral as iterated integrals.

== G ==
Gamma
Gamma function.
Gauss
1. The Gauss–Green formula
2. Gaussian kernel
generalized
A generalized function is an element of some function space that contains the space of ordinary (e.g., locally integrable) functions. Examples are Schwartz's distributions and Sato's hyperfunctions.
germ
The germ of a function at a point $p$ is the equivalence class of functions (of some class) on neighborhoods of the point, where $f \sim g$ if the restrictions of $f, g$ are the same on some neighborhood of the point.
Grandi
Grandi's series is the series $\sum_0^{\infty} (-1)^n$. It is divergent but some summation methods can be used to show its value is $1/2$.
Grauert
1. Hans Grauert.
2. Grauert's approximation theorem.

== H ==
Hardy-Littlewood maximal inequality
The Hardy-Littlewood maximal function of $f \in L^1(\mathbb R^n)$ is

$$Hf(x) := \sup_{r>0} \frac{1}{m(B_r(x))} \int_{B_r(x)} |f|.$$

The Hardy-Littlewood maximal inequality states that there is some constant $C$ such that for all $f \in L^1(\mathbb R^n)$ and all $\alpha > 0$,

$$m\left(\{ x : Hf(x) > \alpha \}\right) < \frac{C}{\alpha} \int_{\mathbb R^n} |f|.$$

Hardy space
Hardy space
Hartogs
1. Hartogs extension theorem
2. Hartogs's theorem on separate holomorphicity
harmonic
A function is harmonic if it satisfies the Laplace equation (in the distribution sense if the function is not twice differentiable).
Hausdorff
The Hausdorff–Young inequality says that the Fourier transformation $\widehat{\cdot} : L^p(\mathbb{R}^n) \to L^{p'}(\mathbb{R}^n)$ is a well-defined bounded operator when $1/p + 1/p' = 1$.
Heaviside
The Heaviside function is the function H on $\mathbb{R}$ such that $H(x) = 1, \, x \ge 0$ and $H(x) = 0, \, x < 0$.
Heine
1. The Heine–Borel theorem says a subset of $\mathbb{R}^n$ is compact if and only if it is closed and bounded.
2. The above theorem follows from a more general result: a metric space is compact if and only if it is complete and totally ordered, since a bounded set in a Euclidean space is totally bounded.
Hermite
Hermite polynomial
Hilbert space
1. A Hilbert space is a real or complex inner product space that is a complete metric space with the metric induced by the inner product.
2. Hilbert transform.
holomorphic function
A function defined on an open subset of $\mathbb C^n$ is holomorphic if it is complex differentiable. Equivalently, a function is holomorphic if it satisfies the Cauchy–Riemann equations (in the distribution sense if the function is not differentiable).
hypoelliptic
A hypoelliptic operator is an operator for which the elliptic regularity holds.

== I ==
infinitesimal
An infinitesimal is a "number" that is greater then zero but is smaller than any positive real number; in particular, it is not a real number.
integrable
A measurable function $f$ is said to be integrable if $\int |f| \, d\mu < \infty$.
integral
1. The integral of the indicator function on a measurable set is the measure (volume) of the set.
2. The integral of a measurable function is then defined by approximating the function by linear combinations of indicator functions.
inverse
The inverse function theorem gives a necessary and sufficient condition for a function to be injective. Note it only gives an "inverse function" on the image of the function.
isolated
An isolated point of a set is a point that is not a limit point of the set.
isometry
An isometry between metric spaces $(X,d_X)$ and $(Y,d_Y)$ is a bijection $f : X \to Y$ that preserves the metric: $d_X(x,x') = d_Y(f(x),f(x'))$ for all $x,x' \in X$.

== J ==
jet
jet space.

== L ==
Laplace
Laplace transform.
Lebesgue differentiation theorem
The Lebesgue differentiation theorem states that for locally integrable $f \in L^1_{\text{loc}}(\mathbb R^n)$, the equalities

$$\lim_{r \to 0} \frac{1}{m(B_r(x))} \int_{B_r(x)} |f(y)-f(x)| \,dy = 0$$

and

$$\lim_{r \to 0} \frac{1}{m(B_r(x))} \int_{B_r(x)} f = f(x)$$

hold for almost every $x$. The set where they hold is called the Lebesgue set of $f$, and points in the Lebesgue set are called Lebesgue points.

Lebesgue dominated convergence theorem
Lebesgue dominated convergence theorem
Lebesgue
1. Lebesgue integral.
2. Lebesgue measure.
3. Given an open cover $\mathcal{U}$ of a metric space $X$, a Lebesgue number for the cover is a real number $\delta > 0$ such that if $S \subset X$ is a subset of diameter $< \delta$, then $S \subset U$ for some $U \in \mathcal{U}$. It exists for example if $X$ is compact.
Legendre
Legendre transformation.
Lelong
1. Lelong number.
2. The Lelong–Poincaré lemma.
Levi
Levi's problem asks to show a pseudoconvex set is a domain of holomorphy.
limit
1. A limit of a sequence.
2. A limit point $p$ of a subset $S$ of a topological space is a point in the space (not necessarily in $S$) such that each neighborhood of $p$ intersects $S - \{ p \}$.
line integral
A line integral is an integration over a curve $c : I \to \mathbb{R}^n$; i.e.,

$$\int_c \omega := \int_I c^* \omega.$$

Liouville
Liouville's theorem says a bounded entire function is a constant function.
Lipschitz
1. A map $f$ between metric spaces is said to be Lipschitz continuous if $\sup_{x \ne y} \frac{d(f(x), f(y))}{d(x, y)} < \infty$.
2. A map is locally Lipschitz continuous if it is Lipschitz continuous on each compact subset.
log
The natural logarithm is the function $\log(x) = \int^x_1 \frac{dy}{y}$.
Lusin
Lusin's theorem.

== M ==
maximum
The maximum principle says that a maximum value of a harmonic function in a connected open set is attained on the boundary.
measurable function
A measurable function is a structure-preserving function between measurable spaces in the sense that the preimage of any measurable set is measurable.
measurable set
A measurable set is an element of a σ-algebra.
measurable space
A measurable space consists of a set and a σ-algebra on that set which specifies what sets are measurable.
measure
A measure is a function on a measurable space that assigns to each measurable set a number representing its measure or size. Specifically, if X is a set and Σ is a σ-algebra on X, then a set-function μ from Σ to the extended real number line is called a measure if the following conditions hold:
- Non-negativity: For all $E \in \Sigma, \ \ \mu(E) \geq 0.$
- $\mu(\varnothing) = 0.$
- Countable additivity (or σ-additivity): For all countable collections $\{ E_k \}_{k=1}^\infty$ of pairwise disjoint sets in Σ,
$$\mu\left(\bigcup_{k=1}^\infty E_k\right)=\sum_{k=1}^\infty \mu(E_k).$$
measure space
A measure space consists of a measurable space and a measure on that measurable space.
meromorphic
A meromorphic function is an equivalence class of functions that are locally fractions of holomorphic functions.
method of stationary phase
The method of stationary phase.
metric space
A metric space is a set X equipped with a function $d : X \times X \to \mathbb R_{\geq 0}$, called a metric, such that (1) $d(x,y) = 0$ iff $x=y$, (2) $d(x,y) \leq d(x,z) + d(z,y)$ for all $x,y,z \in X$, (3) $d(x,y) = d(y,x)$ for all $x,y \in X$.
microfunction
microfunction
microlocal
The notion microlocal refers to a consideration on the cotangent bundle to a space as opposed to that on the space itself. Explicitly, it amounts to considering functions on both points and momenta; not just functions on points.
Minkowski
Minkowski inequality
modulus
modulus of continuity.
Montel
Montel's theorem.
monotone
1. A sequence of numbers or functions is called monotone or monotonic if it is either weakly increasing $x_1 \le x_2 \le \cdots$ or weakly decreasing.
2. The monotone convergence theorem for real numbers says a monotone sequence is bounded if and only if it converges.
3. Lebesgue's monotone convergence theorem.
Morera
Morera's theorem says a function is holomorphic if the integrations of it over arbitrary closed loops are zero.
Morse
Morse function.

== N ==
Nash
1. Nash function.
2. Nash–Moser theorem.
Nevanlinna theory
Nevanlinna theory concerns meromorphic functions.
net
1. A net is a generalization of a sequence. Precisely, a net on a set $X$ is a map from a directed set to $X$, where a directed set is a preordered set in which each finite subset has an upper bound.
2. A net $x_{\alpha}$ converges to a point $x$ if for each neighborhood $U$ of $x$, there is some $\alpha$ such that $\{ x_{\beta} \mid \beta \gtrsim \alpha \} \subset U$.
nonmeasurable
Among the consequences of the axiom of choice is that there exists a subset of $\mathbb{R}$ that is not (Lebesgue) measurable, a construction due to Vitali. Note there is a model of set theory in which every subset of $\mathbb{R}$ is measurable so Choice here cannot be avoided.
nonsmooth analysis
Nonsmooth analysis is a branch of mathematical analysis that concerns non-smooth functions like Lipschitz functions and has applications to optimization theory or control theory. Note this theory is generally different from distributional calculus, a calculus based on distributions.
normed vector space
A normed vector space, also called a normed space, is a real or complex vector space V on which a norm is defined. A norm is a map $\lVert\cdot \rVert : V \to \mathbb R$ satisfying four axioms:
1. Non-negativity: for every $x\in V$,$\; \lVert x \rVert \ge 0$.
2. Positive definiteness: for every $x \in V$, $\; \lVert x\rVert=0$ if and only if $x$ is the zero vector.
3. Absolute homogeneity: for every scalar $\lambda$ and $x\in V$,
  $$\lVert \lambda x \rVert = |\lambda|\, \lVert x\rVert$$
4. Triangle inequality: for every $x\in V$ and $y\in V$,
  $$\|x+y\| \leq \|x\| + \|y\|.$$

== O ==
Oka
Oka's coherence theorem says the sheaf $\mathcal{O}_{\mathbb{C}^n}$ of holomorphic functions is coherent.
open
The open mapping theorem (complex analysis)
oscillatory integral
An oscillatory integral can give a sense to a formal integral expression like $\delta_0(x) = \int e^{2 \pi i x \cdot \xi} \, d\xi.$

== P ==
Paley
Paley–Wiener theorem
phase
The phase space to a configuration space $X$ (in classical mechanics) is the cotangent bundle $T^* X$ to $X$.
Plancherel
Plancherel's theorem says the Fourier transformation is a unitary operator.
Plateau
Plateau problem concerns the existence of a minimal surface.
plurisubharmonic
A function $f$ on an open subset $U \subset \mathbb{C}$ is said to be plurisubharmonic if $t \mapsto f(z + tw)$ is subharmonic for $t$ in a neighborhood of zero in $\mathbb{C}$ and points $z, w$ in $U$.
Poisson
Poisson kernel
power series
A power series is informally a polynomial of infinite degree; i.e., $\sum_{n=0}^{\infty} a_n x^n$. (Mathematically, it is the same thing as a sequence $a_1, a_2, \cdots,$ but is usually treated like a polynomial of infinite degree.)
primitive
A primitive function of a function; another name for an anti-derivative.
pseudoconex
A pseudoconvex set is a generalization of a convex set.
pseudodifferential
A pseudodifferential operator is a generalization of a differential operator by allowing symbols to have poles.

== R ==
Rademacher
Rademacher's theorem says a locally Lipschitz function is differentiable almost everywhere.
Radon
1. Let $X$ be a locally compact Hausdorff space and let $I$ be a positive linear functional on the space of continuous functions with compact support $C_c(X)$. Positivity means that $I(f) \geq 0$ if $f \geq 0$. There exist Borel measures $\mu$ on $X$ such that $I(f) = \int f \, d\mu$ for all $f \in C_c(X)$. A Radon measure on $X$ is a Borel measure that is finite on all compact sets, outer regular on all Borel sets, and inner regular on all open sets. These conditions guarantee that there exists a unique Radon measure $\mu$ on $X$ such that $I(f) = \int f \, d\mu$ for all $f \in C_c(X)$.
2. Radon–Nikodym theorem.
Ramanujan
Ramanujan summation.
rank
The rank theorem.
Ray
A Ray–Singer metric.
real
1. A real number is usually defined as either a Dedekind cut or an element in the Cauchy completion of $\mathbb{Q}$. The axiom of choice is needed to rule out some pathology; for example, without it, there can be an infinite set of real numbers that has no countable subset (which falsifies many basic results).
2.

The name "real analysis" is something of an anachronism. Originally applied to the theory of functions of a real variable, it has come to encompass several subjects of a more general and abstract nature that underlie much of modem analysis.

— G. B. Folland
Real analysis refers to a study of functions in real variables but may include some functional analysis such as measure theory.
3. A real-analytic function is a function given by a convergent power series.
Riesz
Riesz's lemma says a closed ball in a normed space is compact if and only if the normed space has finite dimension.
Rellich
Rellich's lemma tells when an inclusion of a Sobolev space to another Sobolev space is a compact operator.
residue
See Cauchy's residue theorem.
Riemann
1. The Riemann integral of a function is either the upper Riemann sum or the lower Riemann sum when the two sums agree.
2. The Riemann zeta function is a (unique) analytic continuation of the function $z \mapsto \sum_1^{\infty} \frac{1}{n^z}, \, \operatorname{Re}(z) > 1$ (it's more traditional to write $s$ for $z$).
3. The Riemann hypothesis, still a conjecture, says each nontrivial zero of the Riemann zeta function has real part equal to $\frac{1}{2}$.
4. Riemann's existence theorem.
5. Riemann rearrangement theorem.
Riesz–Fischer
The Riesz–Fischer theorem says the L^{p} space is complete.
Runge
1. Runge's approximation theorem.
2. Runge domain.

== S ==
Sato
Sato's hyperfunction, a type of a generalized function.
Schwarz
A Schwarz function is a function that is both smooth and rapid-decay.
Schwarz lemma
Schwarz lemma
semianalytic
The notion of semianalytic is an analog of semialgebraic.
semicontinuous
A semicontinuous function.
separable
A topological space is separable if it has a dense at most countable subset.
sequence
A sequence on a set $X$ is a map $\mathbb{N} \to X$.
series
A series is informally an infinite summation process $x_1 + x_2 + \cdots$. Thus, mathematically, specifying a series is the same as specifying the sequence of the terms in the series. The difference is that, when considering a series, one is often interested in whether the sequence of partial sums $s_n := x_1 + \cdots + x_n$ converges or not and if so, to what.
σ-algebra
A σ-algebra on a set is a nonempty collection of subsets closed under complements, countable unions, and countable intersections.
Stieltjes
Stieltjes–Vitali theorem
Stone–Weierstrass theorem
The Stone–Weierstrass theorem is any one of a number of related generalizations of the Weierstrass approximation theorem, which states that any continuous real-valued function defined on a closed interval can be uniformly approximated by polynomials. Let $X$ be a compact Hausdorff space and let $C(X,\mathbb R)$ have the uniform metric. One version of the Stone–Weierstrass theorem states that if $\mathcal A$ is a closed subalgebra of $C(X,\mathbb R)$ that separates points and contains a nonzero constant function, then in fact $\mathcal A = C(X,\mathbb R)$. If a subalgebra is not closed, taking the closure and applying the previous version of the Stone–Weierstrass theorem reveals a different version of the theorem: if $\mathcal A$ is a subalgebra of $C(X,\mathbb R)$ that separates points and contains a nonzero constant function, then $\mathcal A$ is dense in $C(X,\mathbb R)$.
subanalytic
subanalytic.
subderivative
subderivative.
subharmonic
A twice continuously differentiable function $f$ is said to be subharmonic if $\Delta f \ge 0$ where $\Delta$ is the Laplacian. The subharmonicity for a more general function is defined by a limiting process.
subsequence
A subsequence of a sequence is another sequence contained in the sequence; more precisely, it is a composition $\mathbb{N} \overset{j}\to \mathbb{N} \overset{x}\to X$ where $j$ is a strictly increasing injection and $x$ is the given sequence.
support
1. The support of a function is the closure of the set of points where the function does not vanish.
2. The support of a distribution is the support of it in the sense in sheaf theory.
symbol
A symbol is a function on the cotangent bundle (usually required to be continuous or holomorphic or etc.); for example, the symbol of a differential operator.
symmetry
symmetry of second derivatives. It often holds but not always.

== T ==
Tauberian
Tauberian theory is a set of results (called tauberian theorems) concerning a divergent series; they are sort of converses to abelian theorems but with some additional conditions.
Taylor
Taylor expansion
tempered
A tempered distribution is a distribution that extends to a continuous linear functional on the space of Schwarz functions.
test
A test function is a compactly-supported smooth function; see also spaces of test functions and distributions.
totally bounded
A metric space is totally bounded if, for each $\epsilon > 0$, it is covered by finitely many open balls of radius $\epsilon$. A metric space is compact if and only if it is totally bounded and complete.

== U ==
Ulam
Ulam number
uniform
1. A sequence of maps $f_n : X \to E$ from a topological space to a normed space (e.g., $\mathbb R$) is said to converge uniformly to $f : X \to E$ if $\operatorname{sup} \| f_n - f \| \to 0$.
2. A map between metric spaces is said to be uniformly continuous if for each $\epsilon > 0$, there exist a $\delta > 0$ such that $d(f(x), f(y)) < \epsilon$ for all $x, y$ with $d(x, y) < \delta$.

== V ==
Vitali covering lemma
The Vitali covering lemma states that if $\mathcal C$ is a collection of open balls in $\mathbb R^n$ and

$$c < m \left(\bigcup_{B \in \mathcal C} B \right),$$

then there exists a finite number of balls $B_1, \ldots, B_n \in \mathcal C$ such that

$$3^n \sum_{j=1}^n m(B_j) > c.$$

== W ==
weak
A weak solution is a generalized function that is a solution of a differential equation.
Weierstrass
1. Weierstrass preparation theorem.
2. Weierstrass division theorem.
3. Weierstrass M-test.
Weitzenböck
Weitzenböck formula.
Weyl
1. Weyl calculus.
2. Weyl quantization.
Whitney
1. The Whitney extension theorem gives a necessary and sufficient condition for a function to be extended from a closed set to a smooth function on the ambient space.
2. Whitney topology
3. Whitney stratification
