= Quasitrace =

In mathematics, especially functional analysis, a quasitrace is a not necessarily additive tracial functional on a C*-algebra. An additive quasitrace is called a trace. It is a major open problem if every quasitrace is a trace.

== Definition ==
A quasitrace on a C*-algebra A is a map $\tau\colon A_+\to[0,\infty]$ such that:

- $\tau$ is homogeneous:

$\tau(\lambda a)=\lambda\tau(a)$ for every $a\in A_+$ and $\lambda\in[0,\infty)$.

- $\tau$ is tracial:

$\tau(xx^*)=\tau(x^*x)$ for every $x\in A$.

- $\tau$ is additive on commuting elements:

$\tau(a+b)=\tau(a)+\tau(b)$ for every $a,b\in A_+$ that satisfy $ab=ba$.

- and such that for each $n\geq 1$ the induced map

$$\tau_n\colon M_n(A)_+\to[0,\infty], (a_{j,k})_{j,k=1,...,n}\mapsto\tau(a_{11})+...\tau(a_{nn})$$

has the same properties.

A quasitrace $\tau$ is:

- bounded if

$$\sup\{\tau(a):a\in A_+, \|a\|\leq 1\} < \infty.$$

- normalized if

$$\sup\{\tau(a):a\in A_+, \|a\|\leq 1\} = 1.$$

- lower semicontinuous if

$\{a\in A_+ : \tau(a)\leq t\}$ is closed for each $t\in[0,\infty)$.

== Variants ==
- A 1-quasitrace is a map $A_+\to[0,\infty]$ that is just homogeneous, tracial and additive on commuting elements, but does not necessarily extend to such a map on matrix algebras over A. If a 1-quasitrace extends to the matrix algebra $M_n(A)$, then it is called a n-quasitrace. There are examples of 1-quasitraces that are not 2-quasitraces. One can show that every 2-quasitrace is automatically a n-quasitrace for every $n\geq 1$. Sometimes in the literature, a quasitrace means a 1-quasitrace and a 2-quasitrace means a quasitrace.

== Properties ==
- A quasitrace that is additive on all elements is called a trace.
- Uffe Haagerup showed that every quasitrace on a unital, exact C*-algebra is additive and thus a trace. The article of Haagerup was circulated as handwritten notes in 1991 and remained unpublished until 2014. Blanchard and Kirchberg removed the assumption of unitality in Haagerup's result. As of today (August 2020) it remains an open problem if every quasitrace is additive.
- Joachim Cuntz showed that a simple, unital C*-algebra is stably finite if and only if it admits a dimension function. A simple, unital C*-algebra is stably finite if and only if it admits a normalized quasitrace. An important consequence is that every simple, unital, stably finite, exact C*-algebra admits a tracial state.
- Every quasitrace on a von Neumann algebra is a trace.
