= Subfactor =

In the theory of von Neumann algebras, a subfactor of a factor $M$ is a subalgebra that is a factor and contains $1$. The theory of subfactors led to the discovery of the Jones polynomial in knot theory.

== Index of a subfactor ==
Usually $M$ is taken to be a factor of type ${\rm II}_1$, so that it has a finite trace. In this case every Hilbert space module $H$ has a dimension $\dim_M(H)$ which is a non-negative real number or $+ \infty$. The index $[M:N]$ of a subfactor $N$ is defined to be $\dim_N(L^2(M))$. Here $L^2(M)$ is the representation of $N$ obtained from the GNS construction of the trace of $M$.

== Jones index theorem ==
This states that if $N$ is a subfactor of $M$ (both of type ${\rm II}_1$) then the index $[M:N]$ is either of the form $4 \cos(\pi /n)^2$ for $n = 3,4,5,...$, or is at least $4$. All these values occur.

The first few values of $4 \cos(\pi /n)^2$ are $1, 2, (3 + \sqrt{5})/2 = 2.618..., 3, 3.247..., ...$

== Basic construction ==
Suppose that $N$ is a subfactor of $M$, and that both are finite von Neumann algebras. The GNS construction produces a Hilbert space $L^2(M)$ acted on by $M$ with a cyclic vector $\Omega$. Let $e_N$ be the projection onto the subspace $N \Omega$. Then $M$ and $e_N$ generate a new von Neumann algebra $\langle M, e_N \rangle$ acting on $L^2(M)$, containing $M$ as a subfactor. The passage from the inclusion of $N$ in $M$ to the inclusion of $M$ in $\langle M, e_N \rangle$ is called the basic construction.

If $N$ and $M$ are both factors of type ${\rm II}_1$ and $N$ has finite index in $M$ then $\langle M, e_N \rangle$ is also of type ${\rm II}_1$. Moreover the inclusions have the same index: $[M:N] = [\langle M, e_N \rangle :M],$ and $tr_{\langle M, e_N \rangle}(e_N) = [M:N]^{-1}$.

== Jones tower ==
Suppose that $N \subset M$ is an inclusion of type ${\rm II}_1$ factors of finite index. By iterating the basic construction we get a tower of inclusions

$$M_{-1} \subset M_0 \subset M_{1} \subset M_{2} \subset \cdots$$

where $M_{-1} = N$ and $M_{0}=M$, and each $M_{n+1} = \langle M_n, e_{n+1} \rangle$ is generated by the previous algebra and a projection. The union of all these algebras has a tracial state $tr$ whose restriction to each $M_n$ is the tracial state, and so the closure of the union is another type ${\rm II}_1$ von Neumann algebra $M_{\infty}$.

The algebra $M_{\infty}$ contains a sequence of projections $e_1, e_2, e_3, ...,$ which satisfy the Temperley–Lieb relations at parameter $\lambda = [M:N]^{-1}$. Moreover, the algebra generated by the $e_n$ is a ${\rm C}^{\star}$-algebra in which the $e_n$ are self-adjoint, and such that $tr(xe_n)= \lambda tr(x)$ when $x$ is in the algebra generated by $e_1$ up to $e_{n-1}$. Whenever these extra conditions are satisfied, the algebra is called a Temperly–Lieb–Jones algebra at parameter $\lambda$. It can be shown to be unique up to $\star$-isomorphism. It exists only when $\lambda$ takes on those special values $4 cos(\pi /n)^2$ for $n = 3,4,5,...$, or the values larger than $4$.

== Standard invariant ==
Suppose that $N \subset M$ is an inclusion of type ${\rm II}_1$ factors of finite index. Let the higher relative commutants be $\mathcal{P}_{n,+}= N' \cap M_{n-1}$ and $\mathcal{P}_{n,-}= M' \cap M_{n}$.

The standard invariant of the subfactor $N \subset M$ is the following grid:

$$\mathbb{C} = \mathcal{P}_{0,+} \subset \mathcal{P}_{1,+} \subset \mathcal{P}_{2,+} \subset \cdots \subset \mathcal{P}_{n,+} \subset \cdots$$
$$\ \ \ \ \ \ \ \ \ \ \ \ \ \ \ \ \ \ \ \ \ \ \ \cup  \ \ \ \ \ \ \ \ \ \cup \ \ \ \ \ \ \ \ \ \ \ \ \ \ \ \ \ \ \ \cup$$
$$\ \ \ \ \ \ \ \ \ \ \ \   \mathbb{C} \  = \mathcal{P}_{0,-} \subset \mathcal{P}_{1,-} \subset \cdots \subset \mathcal{P}_{n-1,-} \subset \cdots$$

which is a complete invariant in the amenable case. A diagrammatic axiomatization of the standard invariant is given by the notion of planar algebra.

== Principal graphs ==
A subfactor of finite index $N \subset M$ is said to be irreducible if either of the following equivalent conditions is satisfied:

- $L^2(M)$ is irreducible as an $(N,M)$ bimodule;
- the relative commutant $N' \cap M$ is $\mathbb{C}$.

In this case $L^2(M)$ defines a $(N,M)$ bimodule $X$ as well as its conjugate $(M,N)$ bimodule $X^{\star}$. The relative tensor product, described in Jones (1983) and often called Connes fusion after a prior definition for general von Neumann algebras of Alain Connes, can be used to define new bimodules over $(N,M)$, $(M,N)$, $(M,M)$ and $(N,N)$ by decomposing the following tensor products into irreducible components:

$$X\boxtimes X^{\star} \boxtimes \cdots \boxtimes X,\,\, X^{\star}\boxtimes X \boxtimes \cdots \boxtimes X^{\star}, \,\, X^{\star} \boxtimes X \boxtimes \cdots \boxtimes X,\,\, X\boxtimes X^{\star} \boxtimes  \cdots \boxtimes X^{\star}.$$

The irreducible $(M,M)$ and $(M,N)$ bimodules arising in this way form the vertices of the principal graph, a bipartite graph. The directed edges of these graphs describe the way an irreducible bimodule decomposes when tensored with $X$ and $X^{\star}$ on the right. The dual principal graph is defined in a similar way using $(N,N)$ and $(N,M)$ bimodules.

Since any bimodule corresponds to the commuting actions of two factors, each factor is contained in the commutant of the other and therefore defines a subfactor. When the bimodule is irreducible, its dimension is defined to be the square root of the index of this subfactor. The dimension is extended additively to direct sums of irreducible bimodules. It is multiplicative with respect to Connes fusion.

The subfactor is said to have finite depth if the principal graph and its dual are finite, i.e. if only finitely many irreducible bimodules occur in these decompositions. In this case if $M$ and $N$ are hyperfinite, Sorin Popa showed that the inclusion $N \subset M$ is isomorphic to the model

$$(\mathbb{C}\otimes \mathrm{End}\, X^{\star} \boxtimes X \boxtimes X^{\star} \boxtimes \cdots)^{\prime\prime} \subset (\mathrm{End}\, X\boxtimes X^{\star} \boxtimes X \boxtimes X^{\star} \boxtimes\cdots )^{\prime\prime},$$

where the ${\rm II}_1$ factors are obtained from the GNS construction with respect to the canonical trace.

== Knot polynomials ==
The algebra generated by the elements $e_n$ with the relations above is called the Temperley–Lieb algebra. This is a quotient of the group algebra of the braid group, so representations of the Temperley–Lieb algebra give representations of the braid group, which in turn often give invariants for knots.

== Bibliography ==
- Jones, Vaughan F.R. (1983), "Index for subfactors", Inventiones Mathematicae, 72: 1–25, Bibcode:1983InMat..72....1J, doi:10.1007/BF01389127
- Wenzl, H.G. (1988), "Hecke algebras of type A_{n} and subfactors", Invent. Math., 92 (2): 349–383, Bibcode:1988InMat..92..349W, doi:10.1007/BF01404457, MR 0696688
- Jones, Vaughan F.R.; Sunder, Viakalathur Shankar (1997). Introduction to subfactors. London Mathematical Society Lecture Note Series. Vol. 234. Cambridge: Cambridge University Press. doi:10.1017/CBO9780511566219. ISBN 0-521-58420-5. MR 1473221.
- Theory of Operator Algebras III by M. Takesaki ISBN 3-540-42913-1
- Wassermann, Antony. "Operators on Hilbert space".
