= Semi-Hilbert space =

Mathematical concept

In functional analysis, a semi-Hilbert space is a complex or real vector space equipped with a positive semidefinite sesquilinear form whose associated quotient space is a Hilbert space. Semi-Hilbert spaces generalize ordinary Hilbert spaces by allowing nonzero vectors to have zero length.

Unlike the inner product of a Hilbert space, the form defining a semi-Hilbert space need not be positive definite. Consequently, it induces a seminorm rather than necessarily a norm. The degeneracy of this seminorm is removed by taking the quotient with respect to its kernel.

== Formal definition ==
Let $V$ be a vector space over $\mathbb K$, where $\mathbb K=\mathbb R$ or $\mathbb C$.

Suppose that

$$\langle\cdot,\cdot\rangle:V\times V\longrightarrow\mathbb K$$

is a positive semidefinite symmetric bilinear form in the real case, or a positive semidefinite Hermitian sesquilinear form in the complex case.

Using the convention that the form is linear in its first argument, it satisfies the following properties.

=== Sesquilinearity ===
For all $x,y,z\in V$ and $a,b\in\mathbb K$,

$$\langle ax+by,z\rangle
=a\langle x,z\rangle+b\langle y,z\rangle.$$

In the complex case, conjugate linearity in the second argument gives

$$\langle x,ay+bz\rangle
=\overline a\langle x,y\rangle+
\overline b\langle x,z\rangle.$$

=== Hermitian symmetry ===
For every $x,y\in V$,

$$\langle x,y\rangle
=\overline{\langle y,x\rangle}.$$

=== Positive semidefiniteness ===
For every $x\in V$,

$$\langle x,x\rangle\geq 0.$$

Unlike a Hilbert space, the condition

$$\langle x,x\rangle=0
\implies x=0$$

is not required.

Define the associated seminorm by

$$p(x)=\sqrt{\langle x,x\rangle}.$$

Its kernel is the vector subspace

$$N=\ker p
=\{x\in V:\langle x,x\rangle=0\}.$$

The quotient vector space

$$V/N$$

inherits a positive definite inner product given by

$$\langle x+N,y+N\rangle_{V/N}
=\langle x,y\rangle_V.$$

A semi-Hilbert space is obtained when this quotient is complete with respect to its induced norm.

Equivalently,

$$(V,\langle\cdot,\cdot\rangle)
\text{ is semi-Hilbert}
\iff
V/N\text{ is Hilbert}.$$

== Fundamental properties ==
=== Cauchy–Schwarz inequality ===
Every positive semidefinite Hermitian form satisfies the Cauchy–Schwarz inequality

$$|\langle x,y\rangle|^2
\leq
\langle x,x\rangle\langle y,y\rangle.$$

Proof.

Suppose first that $\langle y,y\rangle>0$.

For every scalar $\lambda\in\mathbb K$, positive semidefiniteness implies

$$0\leq
\langle x-\lambda y,x-\lambda y\rangle.$$

Expanding,

$$0\leq
\langle x,x\rangle
-\overline\lambda\langle x,y\rangle
-\lambda\langle y,x\rangle
+|\lambda|^2\langle y,y\rangle.$$

Choose

$$\lambda=
\frac{\langle x,y\rangle}{\langle y,y\rangle}.$$

Substitution yields

$$0\leq
\langle x,x\rangle
-\frac{|\langle x,y\rangle|^2}
{\langle y,y\rangle}.$$

Therefore,

$$|\langle x,y\rangle|^2
\leq
\langle x,x\rangle\langle y,y\rangle.$$

If $\langle y,y\rangle=0$, positivity of

$$\langle x+ty,x+ty\rangle$$

for arbitrary real or complex scalars $t$ implies that $\langle x,y\rangle=0$. The inequality follows in this case as well.

=== Characterization of the null space ===
Proposition. The kernel of the induced seminorm coincides with the radical of the positive semidefinite form:

$$N=
\{x\in V:\langle x,y\rangle=0
\text{ for every }y\in V\}.$$

Proof.

If $x\in N$, then

$$\langle x,x\rangle=0.$$

By the Cauchy–Schwarz inequality,

$$|\langle x,y\rangle|^2
\leq
\langle x,x\rangle\langle y,y\rangle
=0.$$

Hence

$$\langle x,y\rangle=0$$

for every $y\in V$.

Conversely, if $\langle x,y\rangle=0$ for every $y\in V$, choosing $y=x$ gives

$$\langle x,x\rangle=0.$$

Thus $x\in N$, proving the equality.

=== Quotient Hilbert space ===
Theorem. Let $V$ be a vector space equipped with a positive semidefinite Hermitian form, and let $N$ be its null space. Then $V/N$ is an inner product space. It is a Hilbert space if and only if it is complete in the induced norm.

Proof.

Define

$$\langle[x],[y]\rangle
=\langle x,y\rangle,$$

where $[x]=x+N$ denotes the equivalence class of $x$.

To establish that this definition is independent of the representatives, suppose

$$x'=x+n_1,\qquad
y'=y+n_2,$$

with $n_1,n_2\in N$.

Then

$$\begin{aligned}
\langle x',y'\rangle
&=\langle x+n_1,y+n_2\rangle\\
&=\langle x,y\rangle
+\langle n_1,y\rangle
+\langle x,n_2\rangle
+\langle n_1,n_2\rangle\\
&=\langle x,y\rangle.
\end{aligned}$$

The final equality follows from the characterization of the null space.

Therefore the quotient form is well-defined.

Furthermore,

$$\langle[x],[x]\rangle=0
\iff x\in N
\iff [x]=0.$$

Thus the induced form is positive definite.

Consequently, $V/N$ is an inner product space, and it is a Hilbert space precisely when it is complete.

== Completeness ==
Completeness of the quotient is an essential part of the definition.

A positive semidefinite form alone does not guarantee that the quotient is complete.

For example, let

$$V=C_c^\infty(\mathbb R),$$

the vector space of smooth compactly supported functions on the real line.

Equip it with the positive definite form

$$\langle f,g\rangle
=
\int_{\mathbb R}
f(x)\overline{g(x)}\,dx.$$

Its null space is trivial:

$$N=\{0\}.$$

However, $V$ is not complete in the induced $L^2$ norm.

Its completion is

$$L^2(\mathbb R).$$

Thus $V$, with this form, is a pre-Hilbert space but not a semi-Hilbert space under the quotient-completeness definition.

More generally, every positive semidefinite Hermitian form determines a Hilbert space after quotienting by its null space and subsequently taking the metric completion.

== Examples ==
=== Degenerate Euclidean space ===
Consider the vector space

$$V=\mathbb R^3$$

with the bilinear form

$$\langle x,y\rangle
=x_1y_1+x_2y_2.$$

The associated seminorm is

$$p(x)=\sqrt{x_1^2+x_2^2}.$$

The null space is

$$N=\{(0,0,t):t\in\mathbb R\}.$$

Hence

$$V/N\cong\mathbb R^2.$$

Since finite-dimensional inner product spaces are complete, the quotient is a Hilbert space.

Therefore $V$ is a semi-Hilbert space.

=== Sobolev-type seminorm ===
Let

$$V=H^1(0,1),$$

the first-order Sobolev space on the interval $(0,1)$.

Define

$$\langle f,g\rangle_D
=
\int_0^1 f'(x)\overline{g'(x)}\,dx.$$

The induced seminorm is

$$p(f)=
\left(
\int_0^1|f'(x)|^2\,dx
\right)^{1/2}.$$

Its null space consists precisely of the almost-everywhere constant functions:

$$N=\{f\in H^1(0,1):f'=0\}.$$

Consequently,

$$H^1(0,1)/N$$

is an inner product space with norm determined by the weak derivative.

By the Poincaré inequality, this quotient is complete.

It is therefore a Hilbert space, making $H^1(0,1)$ a semi-Hilbert space under the derivative form.

== Relationship to Hilbert spaces ==
Every Hilbert space is a semi-Hilbert space with trivial null space.

Conversely, a semi-Hilbert space is a Hilbert space under its defining form if and only if

$$N=\{0\}.$$

The canonical quotient mapping

$$q:V\longrightarrow V/N$$

satisfies

$$\|q(x)\|_{V/N}=p(x).$$

Thus the quotient identifies vectors whose difference has zero seminorm.

In particular,

$$q(x)=q(y)
\iff p(x-y)=0.$$

This construction allows positive semidefinite forms to be studied using the ordinary theory of Hilbert spaces.

norm.
