= Operator topologies =

Topologies on operators on a Hilbert space

In the mathematical field of functional analysis there are several standard topologies which are given to the algebra B(X) of bounded linear operators on a Banach space X.

== Introduction ==
Let $(T_n)_{n \in \mathbb N}$ be a sequence of linear operators on the Banach space $X$. Consider the statement that $(T_n)_{n \in \N}$ converges to some operator $T$ on $X$. This could have several different meanings:

- If $\|T_n - T\| \to 0$, that is, the operator norm of $T_n - T$ (the supremum of $\| T_n x - T x \|_X$, where $x$ ranges over the unit ball in $X$) converges to $0$, we say that $T_n \to T$ in the uniform operator topology.
- If $T_n x \to Tx$ for all $x \in X$, then we say $T_n \to T$ in the strong operator topology.
- Finally, suppose that for all $x \in X$ we have $T_n x \to Tx$ in the weak topology of $X$. This means that $F(T_n x) \to F(T x)$ for all continuous linear functionals $F$ on $X$. In this case we say that $T_n \to T$ in the weak operator topology.

== List of topologies on B(H) ==
Diagram of relations among topologies on the space B(X) of bounded operators

There are many topologies that can be defined on B(X) besides the ones used above; most are at first only defined when X = H is a Hilbert space, even though in many cases there are appropriate generalisations. The topologies listed below are all locally convex, which implies that they are defined by a family of seminorms.

In analysis, a topology is called strong if it has many open sets and weak if it has few open sets, so that the corresponding modes of convergence are, respectively, strong and weak. (In topology proper, these terms can suggest the opposite meaning, so strong and weak are replaced with, respectively, fine and coarse.) The diagram on the right is a summary of the relations, with the arrows pointing from strong to weak.

If H is a Hilbert space, the linear space of Hilbert space operators B(X) has a (unique) predual $B(H)_*$, consisting of the trace class operators, whose dual is B(X). The seminorm p_{w}(x) for w positive in the predual is defined to be B(w, x^{*}x)^{1/2}.

If B is a vector space of linear maps on the vector space A, then σ(A, B) is defined to be the weakest topology on A such that all elements of B are continuous.

- The norm topology or uniform topology or uniform operator topology is defined by the usual norm ||x|| on B(H). It is stronger than all the other topologies below.
- The weak (Banach space) topology is σ(B(H), B(H)^{*}), in other words the weakest topology such that all elements of the dual B(H)^{*} are continuous. It is the weak topology on the Banach space B(H). It is stronger than the ultraweak and weak operator topologies. (Warning: the weak Banach space topology and the weak operator topology and the ultraweak topology are all sometimes called the weak topology, but they are different.)
- The Mackey topology or Arens-Mackey topology is the strongest locally convex topology on B(H) such that the dual is B(H)_{*}, and is also the uniform convergence topology on Bσ(B(H)_{*}, B(H)-compact convex subsets of B(H)_{*}. It is stronger than all topologies below.
- The σ-strong-^{*} topology or ultrastrong-^{*} topology is the weakest topology stronger than the ultrastrong topology such that the adjoint map is continuous. It is defined by the family of seminorms p_{w}(x) and p_{w}(x^{*}) for positive elements w of B(H)_{*}. It is stronger than all topologies below.
- The σ-strong topology or ultrastrong topology or strongest topology or strongest operator topology is defined by the family of seminorms p_{w}(x) for positive elements w of B(H)_{*}. It is stronger than all the topologies below other than the strong^{*} topology. Warning: in spite of the name "strongest topology", it is weaker than the norm topology.)
- The σ-weak topology or ultraweak topology or weak-^{*} operator topology or weak-* topology or weak topology or σ(B(H), B(H)_{*}) topology is defined by the family of seminorms |(w, x)| for elements w of B(H)_{*}. It is stronger than the weak operator topology. (Warning: the weak Banach space topology and the weak operator topology and the ultraweak topology are all sometimes called the weak topology, but they are different.)
- The strong-^{*} operator topology or strong-^{*} topology is defined by the seminorms ||x(h)|| and ||x^{*}(h)|| for h ∈ H. It is stronger than the strong and weak operator topologies.
- The strong operator topology (SOT) or strong topology is defined by the seminorms ||x(h)|| for h ∈ H. It is stronger than the weak operator topology.
- The weak operator topology (WOT) or weak topology is defined by the seminorms |(x(h_{1}), h_{2})| for h_{1}, h_{2} ∈ H. (Warning: the weak Banach space topology, the weak operator topology, and the ultraweak topology are all sometimes called the weak topology, but they are different.)

== Relations between the topologies ==
The continuous linear functionals on B(H) for the weak, strong, and strong^{*} (operator) topologies are the same, and are the finite linear combinations of the linear functionals (xh_{1}, h_{2}) for h_{1}, h_{2} ∈ H. The continuous linear functionals on B(H) for the ultraweak, ultrastrong, ultrastrong^{*} and Arens-Mackey topologies are the same, and are the elements of the predual B(H)_{*}.

By definition, the continuous linear functionals in the norm topology are the same as those in the weak Banach space topology. This dual is a rather large space with many pathological elements.

On norm bounded sets of B(H), the weak (operator) and ultraweak topologies coincide. This can be seen via, for instance, the Banach–Alaoglu theorem. For essentially the same reason, the ultrastrong topology is the same as the strong topology on any (norm) bounded subset of B(H). Same is true for the Arens-Mackey topology, the ultrastrong^{*}, and the strong^{*} topology.

In locally convex spaces, closure of convex sets can be characterized by the continuous linear functionals. Therefore, for a convex subset K of B(H), the conditions that K be closed in the ultrastrong^{*}, ultrastrong, and ultraweak topologies are all equivalent and are also equivalent to the conditions that for all r > 0, K has closed intersection with the closed ball of radius r in the strong^{*}, strong, or weak (operator) topologies.

The norm topology is metrizable and the others are not; in fact they fail to be first-countable. However, when H is separable, all the topologies above are metrizable when restricted to the unit ball (or to any norm-bounded subset).

== Topology to use ==
The most commonly used topologies are the norm, strong, and weak operator topologies. The weak operator topology is useful for compactness arguments, because the unit ball is compact by the Banach–Alaoglu theorem. The norm topology is fundamental because it makes B(H) into a Banach space, but it is too strong for many purposes; for example, B(H) is not separable in this topology. The strong operator topology could be the most commonly used.

The ultraweak and ultrastrong topologies are better-behaved than the weak and strong operator topologies, but their definitions are more complicated, so they are usually not used unless their better properties are really needed. For example, the dual space of B(H) in the weak or strong operator topology is too small to have much analytic content.

The adjoint map is not continuous in the strong operator and ultrastrong topologies, while the strong* and ultrastrong* topologies are modifications so that the adjoint becomes continuous. They are not used very often.

The Arens–Mackey topology and the weak Banach space topology are relatively rarely used.

To summarize, the three essential topologies on B(H) are the norm, ultrastrong, and ultraweak topologies. The weak and strong operator topologies are widely used as convenient approximations to the ultraweak and ultrastrong topologies. The other topologies are relatively obscure.

== See also ==
- Bounded operator – Kind of linear transformation
- Continuous linear operator – Function between topological vector spaces
- Hilbert space – Type of vector space in math
- List of topologies – List of concrete topologies and topological spaces
- Modes of convergence – Property of a sequence or series
- Norm (mathematics) – Length in a vector space
- Topologies on spaces of linear maps
- Vague topology
- Weak convergence (Hilbert space) – Type of convergence in Hilbert spaces
