= Weak convergence (Hilbert space) =

Type of convergence in Hilbert spaces

In mathematics, weak convergence in a Hilbert space is the convergence of a sequence of points in the weak topology.

== Definition ==
A sequence of points $(x_n)$ in a Hilbert space $H$ is said to converge weakly to a point $x$ in $H$ if

$$\lim_{n\to\infty}\langle x_n,y \rangle = \langle x,y \rangle$$

for all $y$ in $H$. Here, $\langle \cdot, \cdot \rangle$ is understood to be the inner product on the Hilbert space. The notation

$$x_n \rightharpoonup x$$

is sometimes used to denote this kind of convergence.

== Properties ==
- If a sequence converges strongly (that is, if it converges in norm), then it converges weakly as well.
- Since every closed and bounded set is weakly relatively compact (its closure in the weak topology is compact), every bounded sequence $x_n$ in a Hilbert space H contains a weakly convergent subsequence. Note that closed and bounded sets are not in general weakly compact in Hilbert spaces (consider the set consisting of an orthonormal basis in an infinite-dimensional Hilbert space which is closed and bounded but not weakly compact since it doesn't contain 0). However, bounded and weakly closed sets are weakly compact so as a consequence every convex bounded closed set is weakly compact.
- As a consequence of the principle of uniform boundedness, every weakly convergent sequence is bounded.
- The norm is (sequentially) weakly lower-semicontinuous: if $x_n$ converges weakly to x, then

$$\Vert x\Vert \le \liminf_{n\to\infty} \Vert x_n \Vert,$$

and this inequality is strict whenever the convergence is not strong. For example, infinite orthonormal sequences converge weakly to zero, as demonstrated below.

- If $x_n \to x$ weakly and $\lVert x_n \rVert \to \lVert x \rVert$, then $x_n \to x$ strongly:

$$\langle x - x_n, x - x_n \rangle = \langle x, x \rangle + \langle x_n, x_n \rangle - \langle x_n, x \rangle - \langle x, x_n \rangle \rightarrow 0.$$

- If the Hilbert space is finite-dimensional, i.e. a Euclidean space, then weak and strong convergence are equivalent.

=== Example ===
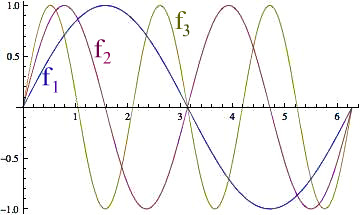
The first three functions in the sequence $f_n(x) = \sin(n x)$ on $[0, 2 \pi]$. As $n \rightarrow \infty$ $f_n$ converges weakly to $f =0$.

The Hilbert space $L^2[0, 2\pi]$ is the space of the square-integrable functions on the interval $[0, 2\pi]$ equipped with the inner product defined by

$$\langle f,g \rangle = \int_0^{2\pi} f(x)\cdot g(x)\,dx,$$

(see L^{p} space). The sequence of functions $f_1, f_2, \ldots$ defined by

$$f_n(x) = \sin(n x)$$

converges weakly to the zero function in $L^2[0, 2\pi]$, as the integral

$$\int_0^{2\pi} \sin(n x)\cdot g(x)\,dx.$$

tends to zero for any square-integrable function $g$ on $[0, 2\pi]$ when $n$ goes to infinity, which is by Riemann–Lebesgue lemma, i.e.

$$\langle f_n,g \rangle \to \langle 0,g \rangle = 0.$$

Although $f_n$ has an increasing number of 0's in $[0,2 \pi]$ as $n$ goes to infinity, it is of course not equal to the zero function for any $n$. Note that $f_n$ does not converge to 0 in the $L_\infty$ or $L_2$ norms. This dissimilarity is one of the reasons why this type of convergence is considered to be "weak."

=== Weak convergence of orthonormal sequences ===
Consider a sequence $e_n$ which was constructed to be orthonormal, that is,

$$\langle e_n, e_m \rangle = \delta_{mn}$$

where $\delta_{mn}$ equals one if m = n and zero otherwise. We claim that if the sequence is infinite, then it converges weakly to zero. A simple proof is as follows. For x ∈ H, we have

$\sum_n | \langle e_n, x \rangle |^2 \leq \| x \|^2$ (Bessel's inequality)

where equality holds when {e_{n}} is a Hilbert space basis. Therefore

$| \langle e_n, x \rangle |^2 \rightarrow 0$ (since the series above converges, its corresponding sequence must go to zero)

i.e.

$$\langle e_n, x \rangle  \rightarrow 0 .$$

== Banach–Saks theorem ==
The Banach–Saks theorem states that every bounded sequence $x_n$ contains a subsequence $x_{n_k}$ and a point x such that

$$\frac{1}{N}\sum_{k=1}^N x_{n_k}$$

converges strongly to x as N goes to infinity.

== Generalizations ==
The definition of weak convergence can be extended to Banach spaces. A sequence of points $(x_n)$ in a Banach space B is said to converge weakly to a point x in B if
$$f(x_n) \to f(x)$$
for any bounded linear functional $f$ defined on $B$, that is, for any $f$ in the dual space $B'$. If $B$ is an Lp space on $\Omega$ and $p<+\infty$, then any such $f$ has the form
$$f(x) = \int_{\Omega} x\,y\,d\mu$$
for some $y\in\,L^q(\Omega)$, where $\mu$ is the measure on $\Omega$ and $\frac{1}{p}+\frac{1}{q}=1$ are conjugate indices.

In the case where $B$ is a Hilbert space, then, by the Riesz representation theorem,
$$f(\cdot) = \langle \cdot,y \rangle$$
for some $y$ in $B$, so one obtains the Hilbert space definition of weak convergence.

== See also ==
- Dual topology
- Operator topologies – topologies on the set of operators on a Hilbert space
