= Ultraweak topology =

In functional analysis, a branch of mathematics, the ultraweak topology, also called the weak-* topology, or weak-* operator topology or σ-weak topology, is a topology on B(H), the space of bounded operators on a Hilbert space H. B(H) admits a predual B_{*}(H), the trace class operators on H. The ultraweak topology is the weak-* topology so induced; in other words, the ultraweak topology is the weakest topology such that predual elements, viewed as evaluation maps, remain continuous on B(H).

== Relation with the weak (operator) topology ==
The ultraweak topology is similar to the weak operator topology. For example, on any norm-bounded set the weak operator and ultraweak topologies are the same, and in particular, the unit ball is compact in both topologies. The ultraweak topology is stronger than the weak operator topology.

One problem with the weak operator topology is that the dual of B(H) with the weak operator topology is "too small". The ultraweak topology fixes this problem: the dual is the full predual B_{*}(H) of all trace class operators. In general the ultraweak topology is more useful than the weak operator topology, but it is more complicated to define, and the weak operator topology is often more apparently convenient.

The ultraweak topology can be obtained from the weak operator topology as follows. If H_{1} is a separable infinite dimensional Hilbert space then B(H) can be embedded in B(H⊗H_{1}) by tensoring with the identity map on H_{1}. Then the restriction of the weak operator topology on B(H⊗H_{1}) is the ultraweak topology of B(H).

== See also ==
- Topologies on the set of operators on a Hilbert space
- Ultrastrong topology
- Weak operator topology
