= Predual =

Banach space of a dual

In mathematics, the predual of an object D is an object P whose dual space is D.

For example, the predual of the space of bounded operators is the space of trace class operators, and the predual of the space L^{∞}(R) of essentially bounded functions on R is the Banach space L^{1}(R) of integrable functions.

In operator algebra, if a dual Banach/operator space $A$ is realized as the dual of some Banach space $A_*$, then $A_*$ is called the predual of $A$ (formally: $A \cong (A_* )^*$). The predual $A_*$ induces a weak topology on $A$, under which algebra operations are separately weak continuous.
