= Strong operator topology =

Locally convex topology on function spaces

In functional analysis, a branch of mathematics, the strong operator topology, often abbreviated SOT, is the locally convex topology on the set of bounded operators on a Hilbert space H induced by the seminorms of the form $T\mapsto\|Tx\|$, as x varies in H.

Equivalently, it is the coarsest topology such that, for each fixed x in H, the evaluation map $T\mapsto Tx$ (taking values in H) is continuous in T. The equivalence of these two definitions can be seen by observing that a subbase for both topologies is given by the sets $U(T_0,x,\epsilon) = \{T : \|Tx-T_0x\| < \epsilon\}$ (where T_{0} is any bounded operator on H, x is any vector and ε is any positive real number).

In concrete terms, this means that $T_i\to T$ in the strong operator topology if and only if $\|T_ix-Tx\|\to 0$ for each x in H.

The SOT is stronger than the weak operator topology and weaker than the norm topology.

The SOT lacks some of the nicer properties that the weak operator topology has, but being stronger, things are sometimes easier to prove in this topology. It can be viewed as more natural, too, since it is simply the topology of pointwise convergence.

The SOT topology also provides the framework for the measurable functional calculus, just as the norm topology does for the continuous functional calculus.

The linear functionals on the set of bounded operators on a Hilbert space that are continuous in the SOT are precisely those continuous in the weak operator topology (WOT). Because of this, the closure of a convex set of operators in the WOT is the same as the closure of that set in the SOT.

This language translates into convergence properties of Hilbert space operators. For a complex Hilbert space, it is easy to verify by the polarization identity, that Strong Operator convergence implies Weak Operator convergence.

== See also ==
- Strongly continuous semigroup
- Topologies on the set of operators on a Hilbert space
