= Weak operator topology =

Weak topology on function spaces

In functional analysis, the weak operator topology, often abbreviated WOT, is the weakest topology on the set of bounded operators on a Hilbert space $H$, such that the functional sending an operator $T$ to the complex number $\langle Tx, y\rangle$ is continuous for any vectors $x$ and $y$ in the Hilbert space.

Explicitly, for an operator $T$ there is base of neighborhoods of the following type: choose a finite number of vectors $x_i$, continuous functionals $y_i$, and positive real constants $\varepsilon_i$ indexed by the same finite set $I$. An operator $S$ lies in the neighborhood if and only if $| y_i(T(x_i) - S(x_i))| < \varepsilon_i$ for all $i \in I$.

Equivalently, a net $T_i \subseteq B(H)$ of bounded operators converges to $T \in B(H)$ in WOT if for all $y \in H^*$ and $x \in H$, the net $y(T_i x)$ converges to $y(T x)$.

== Relationship with other topologies on B(H) ==
The WOT is the weakest among all common topologies on $B(H)$, the bounded operators on a Hilbert space $H$.

=== Strong operator topology ===
The strong operator topology, or SOT, on $B(H)$ is the topology of pointwise convergence. Because the inner product is a continuous function, the SOT is stronger than WOT. The following example shows that this inclusion is strict. Let $H = \ell^2(\mathbb N)$ and consider the sequence $\{T^n\}$ of right shifts. An application of Cauchy-Schwarz shows that $T^n \to 0$ in WOT. But clearly $T^n$ does not converge to $0$ in SOT.

The linear functionals on the set of bounded operators on a Hilbert space that are continuous in the strong operator topology are precisely those that are continuous in the WOT (actually, the WOT is the weakest operator topology that leaves continuous all strongly continuous linear functionals on the set $B(H)$ of bounded operators on the Hilbert space H). Because of this fact, the closure of a convex set of operators in the WOT is the same as the closure of that set in the SOT.

It follows from the polarization identity that a net $\{T_\alpha\}$ converges to $0$ in SOT if and only if $T_\alpha^* T_\alpha \to 0$ in WOT.

=== Weak-star operator topology ===
The predual of B(H) is the trace class operators C_{1}(H), and it generates the w*-topology on B(H), called the weak-star operator topology or σ-weak topology. The weak-operator and σ-weak topologies agree on norm-bounded sets in B(H).

A net {T_{α}} ⊂ B(H) converges to T in WOT if and only Tr(T_{α}F) converges to Tr(TF) for all finite-rank operator F. Since every finite-rank operator is trace-class, this implies that WOT is weaker than the σ-weak topology. To see why the claim is true, recall that every finite-rank operator F is a finite sum

$$F = \sum_{i=1}^n \lambda_i u_i v_i^*.$$

So {T_{α}} converges to T in WOT means

$$\text{Tr} \left ( T_{\alpha} F \right )  =  \sum_{i=1}^n \lambda_i v_i^* \left ( T_{\alpha} u_i \right ) \longrightarrow \sum_{i=1}^n \lambda_i v_i^* \left ( T u_i \right ) = \text{Tr} (TF).$$

Extending slightly, one can say that the weak-operator and σ-weak topologies agree on norm-bounded sets in B(H): Every trace-class operator is of the form

$$S = \sum_i \lambda_i u_i v_i^*,$$

where the series $\sum\nolimits_i \lambda_i$ converges. Suppose $\sup\nolimits_{\alpha} \|T_{\alpha} \| = k < \infty,$ and $T_{\alpha} \to T$ in WOT. For every trace-class S,

$$\text{Tr} \left ( T_{\alpha} S \right )  =  \sum_i \lambda_i v_i^* \left ( T_{\alpha} u_i \right ) \longrightarrow \sum_i \lambda_i v_i^* \left ( T u_i \right ) = \text{Tr} (TS),$$

by invoking, for instance, the dominated convergence theorem.

Therefore every norm-bounded closed set is compact in WOT, by the Banach–Alaoglu theorem.

== Other properties ==
The adjoint operation T → T*, as an immediate consequence of its definition, is continuous in WOT.

Multiplication is not jointly continuous in WOT: again let $T$ be the unilateral shift. Appealing to Cauchy-Schwarz, one has that both T^{n} and T*^{n} converges to 0 in WOT. But T*^{n}T^{n} is the identity operator for all $n$. (Because WOT coincides with the σ-weak topology on bounded sets, multiplication is not jointly continuous in the σ-weak topology.)

However, a weaker claim can be made: multiplication is separately continuous in WOT. If a net T_{i} → T in WOT, then ST_{i} → ST and T_{i}S → TS in WOT.

== SOT and WOT on B(X,Y) when X and Y are normed spaces ==
We can extend the definitions of SOT and WOT to the more general setting where X and Y are normed spaces and $B(X,Y)$ is the space of bounded linear operators of the form $T:X\to Y$. In this case, each pair $x\in X$ and $y^*\in Y^*$ defines a seminorm $\|\cdot\|_{x,y^*}$ on $B(X,Y)$ via the rule $\|T\|_{x,y^*}=|y^*(Tx)|$. The resulting family of seminorms generates the weak operator topology on $B(X,Y)$. Equivalently, the WOT on $B(X,Y)$ is formed by taking for basic open neighborhoods those sets of the form

$$N(T,F,\Lambda,\epsilon):= \left \{S\in B(X,Y): \left |y^*((S-T)x) \right |<\epsilon,x\in F,y^*\in\Lambda \right \},$$

where $T\in B(X,Y), F\subseteq X$ is a finite set, $\Lambda\subseteq Y^*$ is also a finite set, and $\epsilon>0$. The space $B(X,Y)$ is a locally convex topological vector space when endowed with the WOT.

The strong operator topology on $B(X,Y)$ is generated by the family of seminorms $\|\cdot\|_x, x\in X,$ via the rules $\|T\|_x=\|Tx\|$. Thus, a topological base for the SOT is given by open neighborhoods of the form

$$N(T,F,\epsilon):=\{S\in B(X,Y):\|(S-T)x\|<\epsilon,x\in F\},$$

where as before $T\in B(X,Y), F\subseteq X$ is a finite set, and $\epsilon>0.$

=== Relationships between different topologies on B(X,Y) ===
The different terminology for the various topologies on $B(X,Y)$ can sometimes be confusing. For instance, "strong convergence" for vectors in a normed space sometimes refers to norm-convergence, which is very often distinct from (and stronger than) SOT-convergence when the normed space in question is $B(X,Y)$. The weak topology on a normed space $X$ is the coarsest topology that makes the linear functionals in $X^*$ continuous; when we take $B(X,Y)$ in place of $X$, the weak topology can be very different than the weak operator topology. And while the WOT is formally weaker than the SOT, the SOT is weaker than the operator norm topology.

In general, the following inclusions hold:

$$\{ \text{WOT-open sets in } B(X,Y)\} \subseteq \{\text{SOT-open sets in }B(X,Y)\} \subseteq \{\text{operator-norm-open sets in }B(X,Y)\},$$

and these inclusions may or may not be strict depending on the choices of $X$ and $Y$.

The WOT on $B(X,Y)$ is a formally weaker topology than the SOT, but they nevertheless share some important properties. For example,

$$(B(X,Y),\text{SOT})^*=(B(X,Y),\text{WOT})^*.$$

Consequently, if $S \subseteq B(X,Y)$ is convex then

$$\overline{S}^\text{SOT}=\overline{S}^\text{WOT},$$

in other words, SOT-closure and WOT-closure coincide for convex sets.

== See also ==
- Topologies on the set of operators on a Hilbert space
- Weak topology – Mathematical term
- Weak-star operator topology
