= Operator algebra =

Branch of functional analysis

In functional analysis, a branch of mathematics, an operator algebra is an algebra of continuous linear operators on a topological vector space, with the multiplication given by the composition of mappings.

The results obtained in the study of operator algebras are often phrased in algebraic terms, while the techniques used are often highly analytic. Although the study of operator algebras is usually classified as a branch of functional analysis, it has direct applications to representation theory, differential geometry, quantum statistical mechanics, quantum information, and quantum field theory.

== Overview ==
Operator algebras can be used to study arbitrary sets of operators with little algebraic relation simultaneously. From this point of view, operator algebras can be regarded as a generalization of spectral theory of a single operator. In general, operator algebras are non-commutative rings.

An operator algebra is typically required to be closed in a specified operator topology inside the whole algebra of continuous linear operators. In particular, it is a set of operators with both algebraic and topological closure properties. In some disciplines such properties are axiomatized and algebras with certain topological structure become the subject of the research.

Though algebras of operators are studied in various contexts (for example, algebras of pseudo-differential operators acting on spaces of distributions), the term operator algebra is usually used in reference to algebras of bounded operators on a Banach space or, even more specifically in reference to algebras of operators on a separable Hilbert space, endowed with the operator norm topology.

In the case of operators on a Hilbert space, the Hermitian adjoint map on operators gives a natural involution, which provides an additional algebraic structure that can be imposed on the algebra. In this context, the best studied examples are self-adjoint operator algebras, meaning that they are closed under taking adjoints. These include C*-algebras, von Neumann algebras, and AW*-algebras. C*-algebras can be easily characterized abstractly by a condition relating the norm, involution and multiplication. Such abstractly defined C*-algebras can be identified to a certain closed subalgebra of the algebra of the continuous linear operators on a suitable Hilbert space. A similar result holds for von Neumann algebras.

Commutative self-adjoint operator algebras can be regarded as the algebra of complex-valued continuous functions on a locally compact space, or that of measurable functions on a standard measurable space. Thus, general operator algebras are often regarded as a noncommutative generalizations of these algebras, or the structure of the base space on which the functions are defined. This point of view is elaborated as the philosophy of noncommutative geometry, which tries to study various non-classical and/or pathological objects by noncommutative operator algebras.

Examples of operator algebras that are not self-adjoint include:

- nest algebras,
- many commutative subspace lattice algebras,
- many limit algebras.

== See also ==
- Banach algebra – Particular kind of algebraic structure
- Matrix mechanics – Formulation of quantum mechanics
- Topologies on the set of operators on a Hilbert space
- Vertex operator algebra – Algebra used in 2D conformal field theories and string theory
