= Naimark =

Naimark is a surname. Notable persons with the surname include:

- Arnold Naimark, Canadian physician, academic and university administrator
- Mark Naimark, Soviet mathematician
- Michael Naimark, American media artist
- Norman Naimark, American historian

== See also ==
- Naimark's problem, a question in the field of functional analysis
- Naimark's dilation theorem
- Gelfand–Naimark theorem
- Gelfand–Naimark–Segal construction
- Neumark (surname)
