= Projectionless C*-algebra =

In mathematics, a projectionless C*-algebra is a C*-algebra with no nontrivial projections. For a unital C*-algebra, the projections 0 and 1 are trivial. While for a non-unital C*-algebra, only 0 is considered trivial. The problem of whether simple infinite-dimensional C*-algebras with this property exist was posed in 1958 by Irving Kaplansky, and the first example of one was published in 1981 by Bruce Blackadar. For commutative C*-algebras, being projectionless is equivalent to its spectrum being connected. Due to this, being projectionless can be considered as a noncommutative analogue of a connected space.

== Examples ==
- C, the algebra of complex numbers.
- The reduced group C*-algebra of the free group on finitely many generators.
- The Jiang-Su algebra is simple, projectionless, and KK-equivalent to C.

== Dimension drop algebras ==
Let $\mathcal{B}_0$ be the class consisting of the C*-algebras $C_0(\mathbb{R}), C_0(\mathbb{R}^2), D_n, SD_n$ for each $n \geq 2$, and let $\mathcal{B}$ be the class of all C*-algebras of the form

$M_{k_1}(B_1) \oplus M_{k_2}(B_2) \oplus ... \oplus M_{k_r}(B_r)$,

where $r, k_1, ..., k_r$ are integers, and where $B_1, ..., B_r$ belong to $\mathcal{B}_0$.

Every C*-algebra A in $\mathcal{B}$ is projectionless, moreover, its only projection is 0.
