= Bunce–Deddens algebra =

In mathematics, a Bunce–Deddens algebra, named after John W. Bunce and James A. Deddens, is a certain type of AT algebra, a direct limit of matrix algebras over the continuous functions on the circle, in which the connecting maps are given by embeddings between families of shift operators with periodic weights.

Each inductive system defining a Bunce–Deddens algebra is associated with a supernatural number, which is a complete invariant for these algebras. In the language of K-theory, the supernatural number correspond to the K_{0} group of the algebra. Also, Bunce–Deddens algebras can be expressed as the C*-crossed product of the Cantor set with a certain natural minimal action known as an odometer action. They also admit a unique tracial state. Together with the fact that they are AT, this implies they have real rank zero.

In a broader context of the classification program for simple separable nuclear C*-algebras, AT-algebras of real rank zero were shown to be completely classified by their K-theory, the Choquet simplex of tracial states, and the natural pairing between K_{0} and traces. The classification of Bunce–Deddens algebras is thus a precursor to the general result.

It is also known that, in general, crossed products arising from minimal homeomorphism on the Cantor set are simple AT-algebras of real rank zero.

== Definition and basic properties ==
=== Definition ===
Let C(T) denote continuous functions on the circle and M_{r}(C(T)) be the C*-algebra of r × r matrices with entries in C(T). For a supernatural number {n_{k}}, the corresponding Bunce–Deddens algebra B({n_{k}}) is the direct limit:

$$B(\{n_k\}) = \varinjlim \cdots \rightarrow M_{n_k}(C( \mathbb{T} )) \; \stackrel{\beta_k}{\rightarrow} \; M_{n_{k+1}}( C(\mathbb{T} )  ) \rightarrow \cdots .$$

One needs to define the embeddings

$$\beta_k : M_{n_k}(C( \mathbb{T} )) \; \rightarrow \; M_{n_{k+1}}(C( \mathbb{T}  )).$$

These imbedding maps arise from the natural embeddings between C*-algebras generated by shifts with periodic weights. For integers n and m, we define an embedding β : M_{n}(C(T)) → M_{nm}(C(T)) as follows. On a separable Hilbert space H, consider the C*-algebra W(n) generated by weighted shifts of fixed period n with respect to a fixed basis. W(n) embeds into W(nm) in the obvious way; any n-periodic weighted shift is also a nm-periodic weighted shift. W(n) is isomorphic to M_{n}(C*(T_{z})), where C*(T_{z}) denotes the Toeplitz algebra. Therefore, W contains the compact operators as an ideal, and modulo this ideal it is M_{n}(C(T)). Because the map from W(n) into W(nm) preserves the compact operators, it descends into an embedding β : M_{n}(C(T)) → M_{nm}(C(T)). It is this embedding that is used in the definition of Bunce–Deddens algebras.

=== The connecting maps ===
The β_{k}'s can be computed more explicitly and we now sketch this computation. This will be useful in obtaining an alternative characterization description of the Bunce–Deddens algebras, and also the classification of these algebras.

The C*-algebra W(n) is in fact singly generated. A particular generator of W(n) is the weighted shift T of period n with periodic weights ½, ..., ½, 1, ½, ..., ½, 1, .... In the appropriate basis of H, T is represented by the n × n operator matrix

$$T =
\begin{bmatrix}
0              & \;           & \cdots            & T_z          \\
\frac{1}{2}I   & \ddots       & \ddots            & \;           \\
\;             & \ddots       & \ddots            & \vdots       \\
\;             & \;           & \frac{1}{2}I      & 0
\end{bmatrix},$$

where T_{z} is the unilateral shift. A direct calculation using functional calculus shows that the C*-algebra generated by T is M_{n}(C*(T_{z})), where C*(T_{z}) denotes the Toeplitz algebra, the C*-algebra generated by the unilateral shift. Since it is clear that M_{n}(C*(T_{z})) contains W(n), this shows W(n) = M_{n}(C*(T_{z})).

From the Toeplitz short exact sequence,

$$0 \rightarrow  \mathcal{K} \; {\rightarrow} \; C^*(T_z) \; {\rightarrow} \; C( \mathbb{T} ) \rightarrow 0,$$

one has,

$$0 \rightarrow  M_n(\mathcal{K}) \; \stackrel{i}{\hookrightarrow} \; M_n(C^*(T_z)) \; \stackrel{j}{\rightarrow} \; M_n(C( \mathbb{T} )) \rightarrow 0,$$

where i is the entrywise embedding map and j the entrywise quotient map on the Toeplitz algebra. So the C*-algebra M_{n_{k}}(C (T)) is singly generated by

$$\tilde{T} =
\begin{bmatrix}
0              & \;           & \cdots            & z          \\
\frac{1}{2}    & \ddots       & \ddots            & \;           \\
\;             & \ddots       & \ddots            & \vdots       \\
\;             & \;           & \frac{1}{2}      & 0
\end{bmatrix},$$

where the scalar entries denote constant functions on the circle and z is the identity function.

For integers n_{k} and n_{k + 1}, where n_{k}divides n_{k + 1}, the natural embedding of W(n_{k}) into W(n_{k + 1}) descends into an (unital) embedding from M_{n_{k}}(C(T)) into M_{n_{k + 1}}(C(T)). This is the connecting map β_{k} from the definition of the Bunce–Deddens algebra that we need to analyze.

For simplicity, assume n_{k} = n and n_{k + 1} = 2n_{k}. The image of the above operator T ∈ W(n) under the natural embedding is the following 2n × 2n operator matrix in W(2n):

$$T \mapsto
\begin{bmatrix}
0              & \;        &                &        &            & \;      &              & T_z          \\
\frac{1}{2}I   & \ddots    &                &        &            &         &              & 0            \\
\;             & \ddots    & \ddots         &        &            &         &              & \vdots       \\
\;             & \;        & \frac{1}{2}I   & 0      &            & \;      &              &              \\
& \;        &                & I      & 0          &         &              &              \\
&           &                & \;     &\frac{1}{2}I& \ddots  &              & \;           \\
\;             &           &                &        &\;          & \ddots  & \ddots       & \vdots       \\
\;             & \;        &                &        &\;          & \;       & \frac{1}{2}I      & 0
\end{bmatrix}
.$$

Therefore, the action of the β_{k} on the generator is

$$\beta_k (\tilde{T}) =
\begin{bmatrix}
0              & \;        &                &        &            & \;      &              &   z          \\
\frac{1}{2}    & \ddots    &                &        &            &         &              & 0            \\
\;             & \ddots    & \ddots         &        &            &         &              & \vdots       \\
\;             & \;        & \frac{1}{2}    & 0      &            & \;      &              &              \\
& \;        &                & 1      & 0          &         &              &              \\
&           &                & \;     &\frac{1}{2} & \ddots  &              & \;           \\
\;             &           &                &        &\;          & \ddots  & \ddots       & \vdots       \\
\;             & \;        &                &        &\;          & \;      & \frac{1}{2}  & 0
\end{bmatrix}
.$$

A computation with matrix units yields that

$$\beta_k (E_{ij}) = E_{ij} \otimes I_2$$

and

$$\beta_k(z E_{11}) = E_{11} \otimes \Zeta_2,$$

where

$$\Zeta_2 =
\begin{bmatrix}
0              & z    \\
1              & 0
\end{bmatrix} \in M_2(C( \mathbb{T})).$$

So

$$\beta_k( f_{ij}(z) ) = f_{ij}(\Zeta_2).\;$$

In this particular instance, β_{k} is called a twice-around embedding. The reason for the terminology is as follows: as z varies on the circle, the eigenvalues of Z_{2} traces out the two disjoint arcs connecting 1 and -1. An explicit computation of eigenvectors shows that the circle of unitaries implementing the diagonalization of Z_{2} in fact connect the beginning and end points of each arc. So in this sense the circle gets wrap around twice by Z_{2}. In general, when n_{k + 1} = m·n_{k}, one has a similar m-times around embedding.

== K-theory and classification ==
Bunce–Deddens algebras are classified by their K_{0} groups. Because all finite-dimensional vector bundles over the circle are homotopically trivial, the K_{0} of M_{r}(C(T)), as an ordered abelian group, is the integers Z with canonical ordered unit r. According to the above calculation of the connecting maps, given a supernatural number {n_{k}}, the K_{0} of the corresponding Bunce–Deddens algebra is precisely the corresponding dense subgroup of the rationals Q.

As it follows from the definition that two Bunce–Deddens algebras with the same supernatural number, in the sense that the two supernatural numbers formally divide each other, are isomorphic, K_{0} is a complete invariant of these algebras.

It also follows from the previous section that the K_{1} group of any Bunce–Deddens algebra is Z.

== As a crossed product ==
=== C*-crossed product ===
A C*-dynamical system is a triple (A, G, σ), where A is a C*-algebra, G a group, and σ an action of G on A via C*-automorphisms. A covariant representation of (A, G, σ) is a representation π of A, and a unitary representation t $\mapsto$ U_{t} of G, on the same Hilbert space, such that

$$U_t \pi(a) U_t^* = \pi(\sigma(t)(a)),$$

for all a, t.

Assume now A is unital and G is discrete. The (C*-)crossed product given by (A, G, σ), denoted by

$$A \rtimes_{\sigma} G,$$

is defined to be the C*-algebra with the following universal property: for any covariant representation (π, U), the C*-algebra generated by its image is a quotient of

$$A \rtimes_{\sigma} G.$$

=== Odometer action on Cantor set ===
The Bunce–Deddens algebras in fact are crossed products of the Cantor sets with a natural action by the integers Z. Consider, for example, the Bunce–Deddens algebra of type 2^{∞}. Write the Cantor set X as sequences of 0's and 1's,

$$X = \prod \{ 0,1 \} ,$$

with the product topology. Define a homeomorphism

$$\alpha: X \rightarrow X$$

by

$$\alpha (x) = x + (\cdots, 0, 0, 1)$$

where + denotes addition with carryover. This is called the odometer action. The homeomorphism α induces an action on C(X) by pre-composition with α. The Bunce–Deddens algebra of type 2^{∞} is isomorphic to the resulting crossed product.
