= Amenable Banach algebra =

In mathematics, specifically in functional analysis, a Banach algebra, A, is amenable if all bounded derivations from A into dual Banach A-bimodules are inner (that is of the form $a\mapsto a.x-x.a$ for some $x$ in the dual module).

An equivalent characterization is that A is amenable if and only if it has a virtual diagonal.

== Examples ==
- If A is a group algebra $L^1(G)$ for some locally compact group G then A is amenable if and only if G is amenable.
- If A is a C*-algebra then A is amenable if and only if it is nuclear.
- If A is a uniform algebra on a compact Hausdorff space then A is amenable if and only if it is trivial (i.e. the algebra C(X) of all continuous complex functions on X).
- If A is amenable and there is a continuous algebra homomorphism $\theta$ from A to another Banach algebra, then the closure of $\overline{\theta(A)}$ is amenable.
