= Naimark theorem =

In mathematics, Naimark theorem may refer to:

- Gelfand–Naimark theorem
- Naimark's dilation theorem
