= Noncommutative topology =

In mathematics, noncommutative topology is a term used for the relationship between topological and C*-algebraic concepts. The term has its origins in the Gelfand–Naimark theorem, which implies the duality of the category of locally compact Hausdorff spaces and the category of commutative C*-algebras. Noncommutative topology is related to analytic noncommutative geometry.

== Examples ==
The premise behind noncommutative topology is that a noncommutative C*-algebra can be treated like the algebra of complex-valued continuous functions on a 'noncommutative space' which does not exist classically. Several topological properties can be formulated as properties of the C*-algebras without making reference to commutativity or the underlying space, and so have an immediate generalization. Among these are:

- compactness (unital)
- σ-compactness (σ-unital)
- dimension (real or stable rank)
- connectedness (projectionless)
- extremally disconnected spaces (AW*-algebras)

Individual elements of a commutative C*-algebra correspond with continuous functions. And so certain types of functions can correspond to certain properties of a C*-algebra. For example, self-adjoint elements of a commutative C*-algebra correspond to real-valued continuous functions. Also, projections (i.e. self-adjoint idempotents) correspond to indicator functions of clopen sets.

Categorical constructions lead to some examples. For example, the coproduct of spaces is the disjoint union and thus corresponds to the direct sum of algebras, which is the product of C*-algebras. Similarly, product topology corresponds to the coproduct of C*-algebras, the tensor product of algebras. In a more specialized setting, compactifications of topologies correspond to unitizations of algebras. So the one-point compactification corresponds to the minimal unitization of C*-algebras, the Stone–Čech compactification corresponds to the multiplier algebra, and corona sets correspond with corona algebras.

There are certain examples of properties where multiple generalizations are possible and it is not clear which is preferable. For example, probability measures can correspond either to states or tracial states. Since all states are vacuously tracial states in the commutative case, it is not clear whether the tracial condition is necessary to be a useful generalization.

== K-theory ==
One of the major examples of this idea is the generalization of topological K-theory to noncommutative C*-algebras in the form of operator K-theory.

A further development in this is a bivariant version of K-theory called KK-theory, which has a composition product

$KK(A,B)\times KK(B,C)\rightarrow KK(A,C)$

of which the ring structure in ordinary K-theory is a special case. The product gives the structure of a category to KK. It has been related to correspondences of algebraic varieties.
