= Idealizer =

In abstract algebra, the idealizer of a subsemigroup T of a semigroup S is the largest subsemigroup of S in which T is an ideal. Such an idealizer is given by

$$\mathbb{I}_S(T)=\{s\in S \mid sT\subseteq T \text{ and } Ts\subseteq T\}.$$

In ring theory, if A is an additive subgroup of a ring R, then $\mathbb{I}_R(A)$ (defined in the multiplicative semigroup of R) is the largest subring of R in which A is a two-sided ideal.

In Lie algebra, if L is a Lie ring (or Lie algebra) with Lie product [x,y], and S is an additive subgroup of L, then the set

$$\{r\in L\mid [r,S]\subseteq S\}$$

is classically called the normalizer of S, however it is apparent that this set is actually the Lie ring equivalent of the idealizer. It is not necessary to specify that [S,r] ⊆ S, because anticommutativity of the Lie product causes [s,r] = −[r,s] ∈ S. The Lie "normalizer" of S is the largest subring of L in which S is a Lie ideal.

== Comments ==
Often, when right or left ideals are the additive subgroups of R of interest, the idealizer is defined more simply by taking advantage of the fact that multiplication by ring elements is already absorbed on one side. Explicitly,

$$\mathbb{I}_R(T)=\{r\in R \mid rT\subseteq T \}$$

if T is a right ideal, or

$$\mathbb{I}_R(L)=\{r\in R \mid Lr\subseteq L \}$$

if L is a left ideal.

In commutative algebra, the idealizer is related to a more general construction. Given a commutative ring R, and given two subsets A and B of a right R-module M, the conductor or transporter is given by

$$(A:B):=\{r\in R \mid Br\subseteq A\}$$.

In terms of this conductor notation, an additive subgroup B of R has idealizer

$$\mathbb{I}_R(B)=(B:B)$$.

When A and B are ideals of R, the conductor is part of the structure of the residuated lattice of ideals of R.

Examples

The multiplier algebra M(A) of a C*-algebra A is isomorphic to the idealizer of π(A) where π is any faithful nondegenerate representation of A on a Hilbert space H.
