= Operator space =

In functional analysis, a discipline within mathematics, an operator space is a normed vector space (not necessarily a Banach space) "given together with an isometric embedding into the space B(H) of all bounded operators on a Hilbert space H.". The appropriate morphisms between operator spaces are completely bounded maps.

== Equivalent formulations ==
Equivalently, an operator space is a subspace of a C*-algebra.

== Category of operator spaces ==
The category of operator spaces includes operator systems and operator algebras. For operator systems, in addition to an induced matrix norm of an operator space, one also has an induced matrix order. For operator algebras, there is still the additional ring structure.

== See also ==
- Gilles Pisier
- Operator system
