= Exact C*-algebra =

In mathematics, an exact C*-algebra is a C*-algebra that preserves exact sequences under the minimum tensor product.

== Definition ==
A C*-algebra E is exact if, for any short exact sequence,

$$0 \;\to\; A \;\xrightarrow{{} \atop f}\; B \;\xrightarrow{g}\; C \;\to\; 0$$

the sequence

$$0\;\to\; A \otimes_\min E\;\xrightarrow{{} \atop {f\otimes \operatorname{id}}}\; B\otimes_\min E \;\xrightarrow{{} \atop {g\otimes \operatorname{id}}}\; C\otimes_\min E \;\to\; 0,$$

where ⊗_{min} denotes the minimum tensor product, is also exact.

== Properties ==
- Every nuclear C*-algebra is exact.
- Every sub-C*-algebra and every quotient of an exact C*-algebra is exact. An extension of exact C*-algebras is not exact in general.
- It follows that every sub-C*-algebra of a nuclear C*-algebra is exact.

== Characterizations ==
Exact C*-algebras have the following equivalent characterizations:

- A C*-algebra A is exact if and only if A is nuclearly embeddable into B(H), the C*-algebra of all bounded operators on a Hilbert space H.
- A C*-algebra is exact if and only if every separable sub-C*-algebra is exact.
- A separable C*-algebra A is exact if and only if it is isomorphic to a subalgebra of the Cuntz algebra $\mathcal{O}_2$.
