= Neumark (disambiguation) =

Neumark comprised a region of the Prussian province of Brandenburg, Germany.

Neumark may also refer to:

- Neumark, Thuringia
- Neumark, Saxony
- Neumark (surname)
- Nowe Miasto Lubawskie (German: Neumark in Westpreußen), a town once in West Prussia, in Poland, situated at river Drwęca
- Všeruby (Domažlice District) or Neumark, a market town in the Czech Republic
- Hungarian March, or Neumark, a brief frontier march established by Emperor Henry III
