= Cyclic and separating vector =

Von Neumann

In mathematics, the notion of a cyclic and separating vector is important in the theory of von Neumann algebras, and, in particular, in Tomita–Takesaki theory. A related notion is that of a vector that is cyclic for a given operator. The existence of cyclic vectors is guaranteed by the Gelfand–Naimark–Segal (GNS) construction.

== Definitions ==
Given a Hilbert space H and a linear space A of bounded linear operators in H, an element Ω of H is said to be cyclic for A if the linear space AΩ = {aΩ: a ∈ A} is norm-dense in H. The element Ω is said to be separating if aΩ = 0 for a in A implies that a = 0. Note that:

- Any element Ω of H defines a semi-norm p on A, with p(a) = ||aΩ||. The statement that "Ω is separating" is then equivalent to the statement that p is actually a norm.
- If Ω is cyclic for A, then it is separating for the commutant A′ of A in B(H), which is the von Neumann algebra consisting of all bounded operators in H that commute with all elements of A, where A is a subset of B(H). In particular, if a belongs to the commutant A′ and satisfies aΩ = 0 for some Ω, then for all b in A, we have that 0 = baΩ = abΩ. Because the subspace bΩ for b in A is dense in the Hilbert space H, this implies that a vanishes on a dense subspace of H. By continuity, this implies that a vanishes everywhere. Hence, Ω is separating for A′.

The following, stronger result holds if A is a *-algebra (an algebra that is closed under adjoints) and unital (i.e., contains the identity operator 1). For a proof, see Proposition 5 of Part I, Chapter 1 of von Neumann algebras.

Proposition If A is a *-algebra of bounded linear operators on H and 1 belongs to A, then Ω is cyclic for A if and only if it is separating for the commutant A′.

A special case occurs when A is a von Neumann algebra, in which case a vector Ω that is cyclic and separating for A is also cyclic and separating for the commutant A′.

== Positive linear functionals ==
A positive linear functional ω on a *-algebra A is said to be faithful if, for any positive element a in A, ω(a) = 0 implies that a = 0.

Every element Ω of the Hilbert space H defines a positive linear functional ω_{Ω} on a *-algebra A of bounded linear operators on H via the inner product ω_{Ω}(a) = (aΩ,Ω), for all a in A. If ω_{Ω} is defined in this way and A is a C*-algebra, then ω_{Ω} is faithful if and only if the vector Ω is separating for A. Note that a von Neumann algebra is a special case of a C*-algebra.

Proposition Let φ and ψ be elements of H that are cyclic for A. Assume that ω_{φ} = ω_{ψ}. Then there exists an isometry U in the commutant A′ such that φ = Uψ.
