= Sherman–Takeda theorem =

In mathematics, specifically in functional analysis, the Sherman–Takeda theorem states that if A is a C*-algebra then its double dual is a W*-algebra, and is isomorphic to the weak closure of A in the universal representation of A.

The theorem was announced by Sherman (1950) and proved by Takeda (1954). The double dual of A is called the universal enveloping W*-algebra of A.
