= Dilation theorem =

Dilation theorem may refer to:

- Dilation theorem for contraction semigroups
- Sz.-Nagy's dilation theorem
- Stinespring dilation theorem
- Naimark's dilation theorem
