= Naimark's problem =

Question in functional analysis

Naimark's problem is a question in functional analysis asked by Naimark (1951). It asks whether every C*-algebra that has only one irreducible $*$-representation up to unitary equivalence is isomorphic to the $*$-algebra of compact operators on some (not necessarily separable) Hilbert space.

The problem has been solved in the affirmative for special cases (specifically for separable and Type-I C*-algebras). Akemann & Weaver (2004) used the diamond principle to construct a C*-algebra with $\aleph_{1}$ generators that serves as a counterexample to Naimark's problem. More precisely, they showed that the existence of a counterexample generated by $\aleph_{1}$ elements is independent of the axioms of Zermelo–Fraenkel set theory and the axiom of choice ($\mathsf{ZFC}$).

Whether Naimark's problem itself is independent of $\mathsf{ZFC}$ remains unknown.

== See also ==
- List of statements undecidable in $\mathsf{ZFC}$
- Gelfand–Naimark theorem
