= Real rank (C*-algebras) =

In mathematics, the real rank of a C*-algebra is a noncommutative analogue of Lebesgue covering dimension. The notion was first introduced by Lawrence G. Brown and Gert K. Pedersen.

== Definition ==
The real rank of a unital C*-algebra A is the smallest non-negative integer n, denoted RR(A), such that for every (n + 1)-tuple (x_{0}, x_{1}, ... ,x_{n}) of self-adjoint elements of A and every ε > 0, there exists an (n + 1)-tuple (y_{0}, y_{1}, ... ,y_{n}) of self-adjoint elements of A such that $\sum_{i=0}^n y_i^2$ is invertible and $\lVert \sum_{i=0}^n (x_i - y_i)^2 \rVert < \varepsilon$. If no such integer exists, then the real rank of A is infinite. The real rank of a non-unital C*-algebra is defined to be the real rank of its unitalization.

== Comparisons with dimension ==
If X is a locally compact Hausdorff space, then RR(C_{0}(X)) = dim(X), where dim is the Lebesgue covering dimension of X. As a result, real rank is considered a noncommutative generalization of dimension, but real rank can be rather different when compared to dimension. For example, most noncommutative tori have real rank zero, despite being a noncommutative version of the two-dimensional torus. For locally compact Hausdorff spaces, being zero-dimensional is equivalent to being totally disconnected. The analogous relationship fails for C*-algebras; while AF-algebras have real rank zero, the converse is false. Formulas that hold for dimension may not generalize for real rank. For example, Brown and Pedersen conjectured that RR(A ⊗ B) ≤ RR(A) + RR(B), since it is true that dim(X × Y) ≤ dim(X) + dim(Y). They proved a special case that if A is AF and B has real rank zero, then A ⊗ B has real rank zero. But in general their conjecture is false, there are C*-algebras A and B with real rank zero such that A ⊗ B has real rank greater than zero.

== Real rank zero ==
C*-algebras with real rank zero are of particular interest. By definition, a unital C*-algebra has real rank zero if and only if the invertible self-adjoint elements of A are dense in the self-adjoint elements of A. This condition is equivalent to the previously studied conditions:

- (FS) The self-adjoint elements of A with finite spectrum are dense in the self-adjoint elements of A.
- (HP) Every hereditary C*-subalgebra of A has an approximate identity consisting of projections.

This equivalence can be used to give many examples of C*-algebras with real rank zero including AW*-algebras, Bunce–Deddens algebras, and von Neumann algebras. More broadly, simple unital purely infinite C*-algebras have real rank zero including the Cuntz algebras and Cuntz–Krieger algebras. Since simple graph C*-algebras are either AF or purely infinite, every simple graph C*-algebra has real rank zero.

Having real rank zero is a property closed under taking direct limits, hereditary C*-subalgebras, and strong Morita equivalence. In particular, if A has real rank zero, then M_{n}(A), the algebra of n × n matrices over A, has real rank zero for any integer n ≥ 1.
