= KK-theory =

Theory in mathematics

In mathematics, KK-theory is a common generalization both of K-homology and K-theory as an additive bivariant functor on separable C*-algebras. This notion was introduced by the Russian mathematician Gennadi Kasparov in 1980.

It was influenced by Atiyah's concept of Fredholm modules for the Atiyah–Singer index theorem, and the classification of extensions of C*-algebras by Lawrence G. Brown, Ronald G. Douglas, and Peter Arthur Fillmore in 1977. In turn, it has had great success in operator algebraic formalism toward the index theory and the classification of nuclear C*-algebras, as it was the key to the solutions of many problems in operator K-theory, such as, for instance, the mere calculation of K-groups. Furthermore, it was essential in the development of the Baum–Connes conjecture and plays a crucial role in noncommutative topology.

KK-theory was followed by a series of similar bifunctor constructions such as the E-theory and the bivariant periodic cyclic theory, most of them having more category-theoretic flavors, or concerning another class of algebras rather than that of the separable C*-algebras, or incorporating group actions.

== Definition ==
The following definition is quite close to the one originally given by Kasparov. This is the form in which most KK-elements arise in applications.

Let A and B be separable C*-algebras, where B is also assumed to be σ-unital. The set of cycles is the set of triples (H, ρ, F), where H is a countably generated graded Hilbert module over B, ρ is a *-representation of A on H as even bounded operators that commute with B, and F is a bounded operator on H of degree 1, which again commutes with B. They are required to fulfill the condition that

$$[F, \rho(a)], (F^2-1)\rho(a), (F-F^*)\rho(a)$$

for a in A are all B-compact operators. A cycle is said to be degenerate if all three expressions are 0 for all a.

Two cycles are said to be homologous, or homotopic, if there is a cycle between A and IB, where IB denotes the C*-algebra of continuous functions from [0, 1] to B, such that there is an even unitary operator from the 0-end of the homotopy to the first cycle, and a unitary operator from the 1-end of the homotopy to the second cycle.

The KK-group KK(A, B) between A and B is then defined to be the set of cycles modulo homotopy. It becomes an abelian group under the direct sum operation of bimodules as the addition, and the class of the degenerate modules as its neutral element.

There are various, but equivalent definitions of the KK-theory, notably the one due to Joachim Cuntz that eliminates bimodule and 'Fredholm' operator F from the picture and puts the accent entirely on the homomorphism ρ. More precisely it can be defined as the set of homotopy classes

$$KK(A,B) = [qA, K(H) \otimes B]$$,

of *-homomorphisms from the classifying algebra qA of quasi-homomorphisms to the C*-algebra of compact operators of an infinite dimensional separable Hilbert space tensored with B. Here, qA is defined as the kernel of the map from the C*-algebraic free product A*A of A with itself to A defined by the identity on both factors.

== Properties ==
When one takes the C*-algebra C of the complex numbers as the first argument of KK as in KK(C, B) this additive group is naturally isomorphic to the K_{0}-group K_{0}(B) of the second argument B. In the Cuntz point of view, a K_{0}-class of B is nothing but a homotopy class of *-homomorphisms from the complex numbers to the stabilization of B. Similarly when one takes the algebra C_{0}(R) of the continuous functions on the real line decaying at infinity as the first argument, the obtained group KK(C_{0}(R), B) is naturally isomorphic to K_{1}(B).

An important property of KK-theory is the so-called Kasparov product, or the composition product,

$$KK(A,B) \times KK(B,C) \to KK(A,C)$$,

which is bilinear with respect to the additive group structures. In particular each element of KK(A, B) gives a homomorphism of K_{*}(A) → K_{*}(B) and another homomorphism K*(B) → K*(A).

The product can be defined much more easily in the Cuntz picture given that there are natural maps from QA to A, and from B to K(H) ⊗ B that induce KK-equivalences.

The composition product gives a new category $\mathsf{KK}$, whose objects are given by the separable C*-algebras while the morphisms between them are given by elements of the corresponding KK-groups. Moreover, any *-homomorphism of A into B induces an element of KK(A, B) and this correspondence gives a functor from the original category of the separable C*-algebras into $\mathsf{KK}$. The approximately inner automorphisms of the algebras become identity morphisms in $\mathsf{KK}$.

This functor $\mathsf{C^*\!-\!alg} \to \mathsf{KK}$ is universal among the split-exact, homotopy invariant and stable additive functors on the category of the separable C*-algebras. Any such theory satisfies Bott periodicity in the appropriate sense since $\mathsf{KK}$ does.

The Kasparov product can be further generalized to the following form:

$$KK(A, B \otimes E) \times KK(B \otimes D, C) \to KK(A \otimes D, C \otimes E).$$

It contains as special cases not only the K-theoretic cup product, but also the K-theoretic cap, cross, and slant products and the product of extensions.
