= Real rank =

Real rank may refer to:

- Real rank of a Lie group, the rank of a maximal split torus in the group.
- Real rank (C*-algebras)
