= Hereditary C*-subalgebra =

In mathematics, a hereditary C*-subalgebra of a C*-algebra is a particular type of C*-subalgebra whose structure is closely related to that of the larger C*-algebra. A C*-subalgebra B of A is a hereditary C*-subalgebra if for all a ∈ A and b ∈ B such that 0 ≤ a ≤ b, we have a ∈ B.

== Properties ==
- A hereditary C*-subalgebra of an approximately finite-dimensional C*-algebra is also AF. This is not true for subalgebras that are not hereditary. For instance, every abelian C*-algebra can be embedded into an AF C*-algebra.
- A C*-subalgebra is called full if it is not contained in any proper (two-sided) closed ideal. Two C*-algebras A and B are called stably isomorphic if A ⊗ K ≅ B ⊗ K, where K is the C*-algebra of compact operators on a separable infinite-dimensional Hilbert space. C*-algebras are stably isomorphic to their full hereditary C*-subalgebras. Hence, two C*-algebras are stably isomorphic if they contain stably isomorphic full hereditary C*-subalgebras.
- Also hereditary C*-subalgebras are those C*-subalgebras in which the restriction of any irreducible representation is also irreducible.

== Correspondence with closed left ideals ==
There is a bijective correspondence between closed left ideals and hereditary C*-subalgebras of A. If L ⊂ A is a closed left ideal, let L* denote the image of L under the *-operation. The set L* is a right ideal and L* ∩ L is a C*-subalgebra. In fact, L* ∩ L is hereditary and the map L ↦ L* ∩ L is a bijection. It follows from this correspondence that every closed ideal is a hereditary C*-subalgebra. Another corollary is that a hereditary C*-subalgebra of a simple C*-algebra is also simple.

== Connections with positive elements ==
If p is a projection of A (or a projection of the multiplier algebra of A), then pAp is a hereditary C*-subalgebra known as a corner of A. More generally, given a positive a ∈ A, the closure of the set aAa is the smallest hereditary C*-subalgebra containing a, denoted by Her(a). If A is separable, then every hereditary C*-subalgebra has this form.

These hereditary C*-subalgebras can bring some insight into the notion of Cuntz subequivalence. In particular, if a and b are positive elements of a C*-algebra A, then $a \precsim b$ if b ∈ Her(a). Hence, a ~ b if Her(a) = Her(b).

If A is unital and the positive element a is invertible, then Her(a) = A. This suggests the following notion for the non-unital case: a ∈ A is said to be strictly positive if Her(a) = A. For example, in the C*-algebra K(H) of compact operators acting on Hilbert space H, a compact operator is strictly positive if and only if its range is dense in H. A commutative C*-algebra contains a strictly positive element if and only if the spectrum of the algebra is σ-compact. More generally, a C*-algebra contains a strictly positive element if and only if the algebra has a sequential approximate identity.
