= Calkin algebra =

In functional analysis, the Calkin algebra, named after John Williams Calkin, is the quotient of B(H), the ring of bounded linear operators on a separable infinite-dimensional Hilbert space H, by the ideal K(H) of compact operators. Here the addition in B(H) is addition of operators and the multiplication in B(H) is composition of operators; it is easy to verify that these operations make B(H) into a ring. When scalar multiplication is also included, B(H) becomes in fact an algebra over the same field over which H is a Hilbert space.

== Properties ==
- Since K(H) is a maximal norm-closed ideal in B(H), the Calkin algebra is simple. In fact, K(H) is the only closed ideal in B(H).
- As a quotient of a C*-algebra by a two-sided ideal, the Calkin algebra is a C*-algebra itself and there is a short exact sequence

$$0 \to K(H) \to B(H) \to B(H)/K(H) \to 0$$

which induces a six-term cyclic exact sequence in K-theory. Those operators in B(H) which are mapped to an invertible element of the Calkin algebra are called Fredholm operators, and their index can be described both using K-theory and directly. One can conclude, for instance, that the collection of unitary operators in the Calkin algebra consists of homotopy classes indexed by the integers Z. This is in contrast to B(H), where the unitary operators are path connected.

- As a C*-algebra, the Calkin algebra is not isomorphic to an algebra of operators on a separable Hilbert space. The Gelfand-Naimark-Segal construction implies that the Calkin algebra is isomorphic to an algebra of operators on a nonseparable Hilbert space, but while for many other C*-algebras there are explicit descriptions of such Hilbert spaces, the Calkin algebra does not have an explicit representation.
- The existence of an outer automorphism of the Calkin algebra is shown to be independent of ZFC, by work of Phillips and Weaver, and Farah.

== Generalizations ==
- One can define a Calkin algebra for any infinite-dimensional complex Hilbert space, not just separable ones.
- An analogous construction can be made by replacing H with a Banach space, which is also called a Calkin algebra.
- The Calkin algebra is the Corona algebra of the algebra of compact operators on a Hilbert space.
