= Gelfand–Raikov theorem =

The Gel'fand–Raikov (Гельфанд–Райков) theorem is a theorem in the mathematics of locally compact topological groups. It states that a locally compact group is completely determined by its (possibly infinite dimensional) unitary representations. The theorem was first published in 1943.

A unitary representation $\rho: G \to U(H)$ of a locally compact group $G$ on a Hilbert space $H = (H, \langle\,,\rangle)$ defines for each pair of vectors $h,k \in H$ a continuous function on $G$, the matrix coefficient, by

$$g \mapsto \langle h, \rho(g)k \rangle$$.

The set of all matrix coefficients for all unitary representations is closed under scalar multiplication (because we can replace $k \to \lambda k$), addition (because of direct sum representations), multiplication (because of tensor representations) and complex conjugation (because of the complex conjugate representations).

The Gel'fand–Raikov theorem now states that the points of $G$ are separated by its irreducible unitary representations, i.e. for any two group elements $g, h \in G$ there exist a Hilbert space $H$ and an irreducible unitary representation $\rho: G \to U(H)$ such that $\rho(g) \ne \rho(h)$. The matrix elements thus separate points, and it then follows from the Stone–Weierstrass theorem that on every compact subset of the group, the matrix elements are dense in the space of continuous functions, which determine the group completely.

== See also ==
- Gelfand–Naimark theorem
- Representation theory
