= Naimark equivalence =

In mathematical representation theory, two representations of a group on topological vector spaces are called Naimark equivalent, named after Mark Naimark, if there is a closed bijective linear map between dense subspaces preserving the group action.
