= Universal representation (C*-algebra) =

In the theory of C*-algebras, the universal representation of a C*-algebra is a faithful representation which is the direct sum of the GNS representations corresponding to the states of the C*-algebra. The various properties of the universal representation are used to obtain information about the ideals and quotients of the C*-algebra. The close relationship between an arbitrary representation of a C*-algebra and its universal representation can be exploited to obtain several criteria for determining whether a linear functional on the algebra is ultraweakly continuous. The method of using the properties of the universal representation as a tool to prove results about the C*-algebra and its representations is commonly referred to as universal representation techniques in the literature.

== Formal definition and properties ==
Definition. Let A be a C*-algebra with state space S. The representation

$$\Phi :=  \bigoplus_{\rho \in S} \pi_\rho$$

on the Hilbert space $H_{\Phi}$ is known as the universal representation of A.

As the universal representation is faithful, A is *-isomorphic to the C*-subalgebra Φ(A) of B(H_{Φ}).

=== States of Φ(A) ===
With τ a state of A, let π_{τ} denote the corresponding GNS representation on the Hilbert space H_{τ}. Using the notation defined here, τ is ω_{x} ∘ π_{τ} for a suitable unit vector x(=x_{τ}) in H_{τ}. Thus τ is ω_{y} ∘ Φ, where y is the unit vector Σ_{ρ∈S} ⊕y_{ρ} in H_{Φ}, defined by y_{τ}=x, y_{ρ}=0(ρ≠τ). Since the mapping τ → τ ∘ Φ^{−1} takes the state space of A onto the state space of Φ(A), it follows that each state of Φ(A) is a vector state.

=== Bounded functionals of Φ(A) ===
Let Φ(A)^{−} denote the weak-operator closure of Φ(A) in B(H_{Φ}). Each bounded linear functional ρ on Φ(A) is weak-operator continuous and extends uniquely preserving norm, to a weak-operator continuous linear functional ρ̅ on the von Neumann algebra Φ(A)^{−}. If ρ is hermitian, or positive, the same is true of ρ̅. The mapping ρ → ρ̅ is an isometric isomorphism from the dual space Φ(A)^{*} onto the predual of Φ(A)^{−}. As the set of linear functionals determining the weak topologies coincide, the weak-operator topology on Φ(A)^{−} coincides with the ultraweak topology. Thus the weak-operator and ultraweak topologies on Φ(A) both coincide with the weak topology of Φ(A) obtained from its norm-dual as a Banach space.

=== Ideals of Φ(A) ===
If K is a convex subset of Φ(A), the ultraweak closure of K (denoted by K^{−})coincides with the strong-operator, weak-operator closures of K in B(H_{Φ}). The norm closure of K is Φ(A) ∩ K^{−}. One can give a description of norm-closed left ideals in Φ(A) from the structure theory of ideals for von Neumann algebras, which is relatively much more simple. If K is a norm-closed left ideal in Φ(A), there is a projection E in Φ(A)^{−} such that

$$K = \Phi(A) \cap \Phi(A)^{-}E, K^{-} = \Phi(A)^{-}E$$

If K is a norm-closed two-sided ideal in Φ(A), E lies in the center of Φ(A)^{−}.

=== Representations of A ===
If π is a representation of A, there is a projection P in the center of Φ(A)^{−} and a *-isomorphism α from the von Neumann algebra Φ(A)^{−}P onto π(A)^{−} such that π(a) = α(Φ(a)P) for each a in A. This can be conveniently captured in the commutative diagram below :

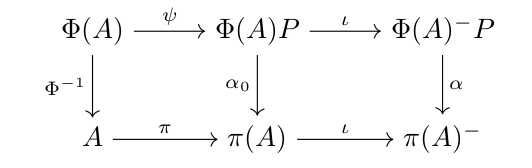

Here ψ is the map that sends a to aP, α_{0} denotes the restriction of α to Φ(A)P, ι denotes the inclusion map.

As α is ultraweakly bicontinuous, the same is true of α_{0}. Moreover, ψ is ultraweakly continuous, and is a *-isomorphism if π is a faithful representation.

=== Ultraweakly continuous, and singular components ===
Let A be a C*-algebra acting on a Hilbert space H. For ρ in A^{*} and S in Φ(A)^{−}, let Sρ in A^{*} be defined by $S\rho(a) = \overline{\rho\circ \Phi^{-1}}(\Phi(a)S)$ for all a in A. If P is the projection in the above commutative diagram when π:A → B(H) is the inclusion mapping, then ρ in A^{*} is ultraweakly continuous if and only if ρ = Pρ. A functional ρ in A^{*} is said to be singular if Pρ = 0. Each ρ in A^{*} can be uniquely expressed in the form ρ=ρ_{u}+ρ_{s}, with ρ_{u} ultraweakly continuous and ρ_{s} singular. Moreover, ‖ρ‖=‖ρ_{u}‖+‖ρ_{s}‖ and if ρ is positive, or hermitian, the same is true of ρ_{u}, ρ_{s}.

== Applications ==
=== Christensen–Haagerup principle ===
Let f and g be continuous, real-valued functions on C^{4m} and C^{4n}, respectively, σ_{1}, σ_{2}, ..., σ_{m} be ultraweakly continuous, linear functionals on a von Neumann algebra R acting on the Hilbert space H, and ρ_{1}, ρ_{2}, ..., ρ_{n} be bounded linear functionals on R such that, for each a in R,
$$\begin{align}
f(\sigma_1(a), \sigma_1(a^*), \sigma_1(aa^*), \sigma_1(a^*a), &\cdots, \sigma_m(a), \sigma_m(a^*), \sigma_m(aa^*), \sigma_m(a^*a)) \\
\le g(\rho_1(a), \rho_1(a^*), \rho_1(aa^*), \rho_1(a^*a), &\cdots, \rho_n(a), \rho_n(a^*), \rho_n(aa^*), \rho_n(a^*a)).
\end{align}$$
Then the above inequality holds if each ρ_{j} is replaced by its ultraweakly continuous component (ρ_{j})_{u}.
