= Primitive ideal =

Annihilator of a simple module

In mathematics, specifically ring theory, a left primitive ideal is the annihilator of a (nonzero) simple left module. A right primitive ideal is defined similarly. Left and right primitive ideals are always two-sided ideals.

Primitive ideals are prime. The quotient of a ring by a left primitive ideal is a left primitive ring. For commutative rings the primitive ideals are maximal, and so commutative primitive rings are all fields.

== Primitive spectrum ==
The primitive spectrum of a ring is a non-commutative analog (Note: A primitive ideal tends to be more of interest than a prime ideal in non-commutative ring theory.) of the prime spectrum of a commutative ring.

Let A be a ring and $\operatorname{Prim}(A)$ the set of all primitive ideals of A. Then there is a topology on $\operatorname{Prim}(A)$, called the Jacobson topology, defined so that the closure of a subset T is the set of primitive ideals of A containing the intersection of elements of T.

Now, suppose A is an associative algebra over a field. Then, by definition, a primitive ideal is the kernel of an irreducible representation $\pi$ of A and thus there is a surjection

$$\pi \mapsto \ker \pi: \widehat{A} \to \operatorname{Prim}(A).$$

Example: the spectrum of a unital C*-algebra.

== See also ==
- Noncommutative algebraic geometry § History
- Dixmier mapping
