= Nuclear C*-algebra =

In the mathematical field of functional analysis, a nuclear C*-algebra is a C*-algebra A such that for every C*-algebra B the injective and projective C*-cross norms coincides on the algebraic tensor product A⊗B and the completion of A⊗B with respect to this norm is a C*-algebra. This property was first studied by Takesaki (1964) under the name "Property T", which is not related to Kazhdan's property T.

== Characterizations ==
Nuclearity admits the following equivalent characterizations:

- The identity map, as a completely positive map, approximately factors through matrix algebras. By this equivalence, nuclearity can be considered a noncommutative analogue of the existence of partitions of unity.
- The enveloping von Neumann algebra is injective.
- It is amenable as a Banach algebra.
- (For separable algebras) It is isomorphic to a C*-subalgebra B of the Cuntz algebra 𝒪_{2} with the property that there exists a conditional expectation from 𝒪_{2} to B.

== Examples ==
The commutative unital C* algebra of (real or complex-valued) continuous functions on a compact Hausdorff space as well as the noncommutative unital algebra of n×n real or complex matrices are nuclear.

== See also ==
- Exact C*-algebra
- Injective tensor product
- Nuclear space – A generalization of finite-dimensional Euclidean spaces different from Hilbert spaces
- Projective tensor product – tensor product defined on two topological vector spaces
