= Cyclic vector =

In the mathematics of operator theory, an operator $A$ on an (infinite-dimensional) Banach space or Hilbert space $H$ has a cyclic vector $f$ if the vectors $f, Af, A^2f,\dots$ span $H$. Equivalently, $f$ is a cyclic vector for $A$ in case the set of all vectors of the form $p(A)f$, where $p$ varies over all polynomials, is dense in $H$.

== See also ==
- Cyclic and separating vector
