= Neumark (surname) =

Neumark is a family name of Scandinavian or Germanic origin. The name can be an Americanized form of the Scandinavian name, Nymark, a common habitual name from farms named with "Ny-Mark" or "new field".

Neumark also derives from Germanic origin and relates to persons from the Neumark region in Brandenburg.

In addition, Neumark can be an Ashkenazi Jewish surname derived from "Nay-Mark" (Yiddish: "new market"). Naymark was a name adopted by merchants such as Aharon Naymark who was a famous fabrics merchant: his descendants today are famous jewelers.

== Neumark ==
- David Neumark (1959–), American economist
- Fritz Neumark (1900–1991), German economist
- Gabi Neumark (1946–2000), Israeli basketball player
- Georg Neumark (1621–1681)
- Gertrude Neumark (1927–2010), American physicist
- Mark Naimark (1909–1978), Soviet mathematician
- Moritz Neumark (1866–1943), German industrialist
