= Group algebra of a locally compact group =

Topological algebra associated to continuous groups

In functional analysis and related areas of mathematics, the group algebra is any of various constructions to assign to a locally compact group an operator algebra (or more generally a Banach algebra), such that representations of the algebra are related to representations of the group. As such, they are similar to the group ring associated to a discrete group.

== The algebra C_{c}(G) of continuous functions with compact support ==
If G is a locally compact Hausdorff group, G carries an essentially unique left-invariant countably additive Borel measure μ called a Haar measure. Using the Haar measure, one can define a convolution operation on the space C_{c}(G) of complex-valued continuous functions on G with compact support; C_{c}(G) can then be given any of various norms and the completion will be a group algebra.

To define the convolution operation, let f and g be two functions in C_{c}(G). For t in G, define

$$[f * g](t) = \int_G f(s) g \left (s^{-1} t \right )\, d \mu(s).$$

The fact that $f * g$ is continuous is immediate from the dominated convergence theorem. Also

$$\operatorname{Support}(f * g) \subseteq \operatorname{Support}(f) \cdot \operatorname{Support}(g)$$

where the dot stands for the product in G. C_{c}(G) also has a natural involution defined by:

$$f^*(s) = \overline{f(s^{-1})} \, \Delta(s^{-1})$$

where Δ is the modular function on G. With this involution, it is a *-algebra.

Theorem. With the norm:

$$\|f\|_1 := \int_G |f(s)| \, d\mu(s),$$

C_{c}(G) becomes an involutive normed algebra with an approximate identity.

The approximate identity can be indexed on a neighborhood basis of the identity consisting of compact sets. Indeed, if V is a compact neighborhood of the identity, let f_{V} be a non-negative continuous function supported in V such that

$$\int_V f_{V}(g)\, d \mu(g) =1.$$

Then {f_{V}}_{V} is an approximate identity. A group algebra has an identity, as opposed to just an approximate identity, if and only if the topology on the group is the discrete topology.

Note that for discrete groups, C_{c}(G) is the same thing as the complex group ring C[G].

The importance of the group algebra is that it captures the unitary representation theory of G as shown in the following

Theorem. Let G be a locally compact group. If U is a strongly continuous unitary representation of G on a Hilbert space H, then

$$\pi_U (f) = \int_G f(g) U(g)\, d \mu(g)$$

is a non-degenerate bounded *-representation of the normed algebra C_{c}(G). The map

$$U \mapsto \pi_U$$

is a bijection between the set of strongly continuous unitary representations of G and non-degenerate bounded *-representations of C_{c}(G). This bijection respects unitary equivalence and strong containment. In particular, π_{U} is irreducible if and only if U is irreducible.

Non-degeneracy of a representation π of C_{c}(G) on a Hilbert space H_{π} means that

$$\left \{\pi(f) \xi : f \in \operatorname{C}_c(G), \xi \in H_\pi \right \}$$

is dense in H_{π}.

== The convolution algebra L^{1}(G) ==
It is a standard theorem of measure theory that the completion of C_{c}(G) in the L^{1}(G) norm is isomorphic to the space L^{1}(G) of equivalence classes of functions which are integrable with respect to the Haar measure, where, as usual, two functions are regarded as equivalent if and only if they differ only on a set of Haar measure zero.

Theorem. L^{1}(G) is a Banach *-algebra with the convolution product and involution defined above and with the L^{1} norm. L^{1}(G) also has a bounded approximate identity.

== The group C*-algebra C*(G) ==
Let C[G] be the group ring of a discrete group G.

For a locally compact group G, the group C*-algebra C*(G) of G is defined to be the C*-enveloping algebra of L^{1}(G), i.e. the completion of C_{c}(G) with respect to the largest C*-norm:

$$\|f\|_{C^*} := \sup_\pi \|\pi(f)\|,$$

where π ranges over all non-degenerate *-representations of C_{c}(G) on Hilbert spaces. When G is discrete, it follows from the triangle inequality that, for any such π, one has:

$$\|\pi (f)\| \leq \| f \|_1,$$

hence the norm is well-defined.

It follows from the definition that, when G is a discrete group, C*(G) has the following universal property: any *-homomorphism from C[G] to some B(H) (the C*-algebra of bounded operators on some Hilbert space H) factors through the inclusion map:

$$\mathbf{C}[G] \hookrightarrow C^*_{\max}(G).$$

=== The reduced group C*-algebra C_{r}*(G) ===
The reduced group C*-algebra C_{r}*(G) is the completion of C_{c}(G) with respect to the norm

$$\|f\|_{C^*_r} := \sup \left \{ \|f*g\|_2: \|g\|_2 = 1 \right \},$$

where

$$\|f\|_2 = \sqrt{\int_G |f|^2 \, d\mu}$$

is the L^{2} norm. Since the completion of C_{c}(G) with regard to the L^{2} norm is a Hilbert space, the C_{r}* norm is the norm of the bounded operator acting on L^{2}(G) by convolution with f and thus a C*-norm.

Equivalently, C_{r}*(G) is the C*-algebra generated by the image of the left regular representation on ℓ^{2}(G).

In general, C_{r}*(G) is a quotient of C*(G). The reduced group C*-algebra is isomorphic to the non-reduced group C*-algebra defined above if and only if G is amenable.

== von Neumann algebras associated to groups ==
The group von Neumann algebra W*(G) of G is the enveloping von Neumann algebra of C*(G).

For a discrete group G, we can consider the Hilbert space ℓ^{2}(G) for which G is an orthonormal basis. Since G operates on ℓ^{2}(G) by permuting the basis vectors, we can identify the complex group ring C[G] with a subalgebra of the algebra of bounded operators on ℓ^{2}(G). The weak closure of this subalgebra, NG, is a von Neumann algebra.

The center of NG can be described in terms of those elements of G whose conjugacy class is finite. In particular, if the identity element of G is the only group element with that property (that is, G has the infinite conjugacy class property), the center of NG consists only of complex multiples of the identity.

NG is isomorphic to the hyperfinite type II_{1} factor if and only if G is countable, amenable, and has the infinite conjugacy class property.

== See also ==
- Graph algebra
- Incidence algebra
- Hecke algebra of a locally compact group
- Path algebra
- Groupoid algebra
- Stereotype algebra
- Stereotype group algebra
- Hopf algebra
