= Operator K-theory =

In mathematics, operator K-theory is a noncommutative analogue of topological K-theory for Banach algebras with most applications used for C*-algebras.

== Overview ==
Operator K-theory resembles topological K-theory more than algebraic K-theory. In particular, a Bott periodicity theorem holds. So there are only two K-groups, namely K_{0}, which is equal to algebraic K_{0}, and K_{1}. As a consequence of the periodicity theorem, it satisfies excision. This means that it associates to an extension of C*-algebras to a long exact sequence, which, by Bott periodicity, reduces to an exact cyclic 6-term-sequence.

Operator K-theory is a generalization of topological K-theory, defined by means of vector bundles on locally compact Hausdorff spaces. Here, a vector bundle over a topological space X is associated to a projection in the C* algebra of matrix-valued—that is, $M_n(\mathbb{C})$-valued—continuous functions over X. Also, it is known that isomorphism of vector bundles translates to Murray-von Neumann equivalence of the associated projection in K ⊗ C(X), where K is the compact operators on a separable Hilbert space.

Hence, the K_{0} group of a (not necessarily commutative) C*-algebra A is defined as Grothendieck group generated by the Murray-von Neumann equivalence classes of projections in K ⊗ C(X). K_{0} is a functor from the category of C*-algebras and *-homomorphisms, to the category of abelian groups and group homomorphisms. The higher K-functors are defined via a C*-version of the suspension: K_{n}(A) = K_{0}(S^{n}(A)), where SA = C_{0}(0,1) ⊗ A.

However, by Bott periodicity, it turns out that K_{n+2}(A) and K_{n}(A) are isomorphic for each n, and thus the only groups produced by this construction are K_{0} and K_{1}.

The key reason for the introduction of K-theoretic methods into the study of C*-algebras was the Fredholm index: Given a bounded linear operator on a Hilbert space that has finite-dimensional kernel and cokernel, one can associate to it an integer, which, as it turns out, reflects the 'defect' on the operator - i.e. the extent to which it is not invertible. The Fredholm index map appears in the 6-term exact sequence given by the Calkin algebra. In the analysis on manifolds, this index and its generalizations played a crucial role in the index theory of Atiyah and Singer, where the topological index of the manifold can be expressed via the index of elliptic operators on it. Later on, Brown, Douglas and Fillmore observed that the Fredholm index was the missing ingredient in classifying essentially normal operators up to certain natural equivalence. These ideas, together with Elliott's classification of AF C*-algebras via K-theory led to a great deal of interest in adapting methods such as K-theory from algebraic topology into the study of operator algebras.

This, in turn, led to K-homology, Kasparov's bivariant KK-theory, and, more recently, Connes and Higson's E-theory.
