= Gelfand–Naimark–Segal construction =

Correspondence in functional analysis

In functional analysis, a discipline within mathematics, given a $C^*$-algebra $A$, the Gelfand–Naimark–Segal construction establishes a correspondence between cyclic $*$-representations of $A$ and certain linear functionals on $A$ (called states). The correspondence is shown by an explicit construction of the $*$-representation from the state. It is named for Israel Gelfand, Mark Naimark, and Irving Segal.

== States and representations ==
A $*$-representation of a $C^*$-algebra $A$ on a Hilbert space $H$ is a mapping $\pi$ from $A$ into the algebra of bounded operators on $H$ such that

- $\pi$ is a ring homomorphism which carries involution on $A$ into involution on operators
- $\pi$ is nondegenerate, that is the space of vectors $\pi (x)$ $\xi$ is dense as $x$ ranges through $A$ and $\xi$ ranges through $H$. Note that if $A$ has an identity, nondegeneracy means exactly $\pi$ is unit-preserving, i.e. $\pi$ maps the identity of $A$ to the identity operator on $H$.

A state on a $C^*$-algebra $A$ is a positive linear functional $f$ of norm $1$. If $A$ has a multiplicative unit element this condition is equivalent to $f(1) = 1$.

For a representation $\pi$ of a $C^*$-algebra $A$ on a Hilbert space $H$, an element $\xi$ is called a cyclic vector if the set of vectors

$$\{\pi(x)\xi:x\in A\}$$

is norm dense in $H$, in which case π is called a cyclic representation. Any non-zero vector of an irreducible representation is cyclic. However, non-zero vectors in a general cyclic representation may fail to be cyclic.

=== The GNS construction ===
Let $\pi$ be a $*$-representation of a $C^*$-algebra $A$ on the Hilbert space $H$ and $\xi$ be a unit norm cyclic vector for $\pi$. Then
$$a \mapsto \langle \pi(a) \xi, \xi\rangle$$
is a state of $A$.

Conversely, every state of $A$ may be viewed as a vector state as above, under a suitable canonical representation.

Theorem.—Given a state $\rho$ of $A$, there is a $*$-representation $\pi$ of $A$ acting on a Hilbert space $H$ with distinguished unit cyclic vector $\xi$ such that $\rho(a)=\langle \pi(a) \xi, \xi \rangle$ for every $a$ in $A$.

Proof
1. Construction of the Hilbert space $H$ Define on $A$ a semi-definite sesquilinear form
  $$\langle a, b \rangle =\rho(b^*a), \; a, b \in A.$$
  By the triangle inequality, the degenerate elements, $a$ in $A$ satisfying $\rho(a^* a)= 0$, form a vector subspace $I$ of $A$. By a $C^*$-algebraic argument, one can show that $I$ is a left ideal of $A$ (known as the left kernel of $\rho$). In fact, it is the largest left ideal in the null space of ρ. The quotient space of $A$ by the vector subspace $I$ is an inner product space with the inner product defined by$\langle a+I,b+I\rangle :=\rho(b^*a),\; a,b\in A$, which is well-defined due to the Cauchy–Schwarz inequality. The Cauchy completion of $A / I$ in the norm induced by this inner product is a Hilbert space, which we denote by $H$.
2. Construction of the representation $\pi$
  Define the action $\pi$ of $A$ on $A / I$ by $\pi(a)(b+I) = ab+I$ of $A$ on $A / I$. The same argument showing $I$ is a left ideal also implies that $\pi(a)$ is a bounded operator on $A / I$ and therefore can be extended uniquely to the completion. Unravelling the definition of the adjoint of an operator on a Hilbert space, $\pi$ turns out to be $*$-preserving. This proves the existence of a $*$-representation $\pi$.
3. Identifying the unit norm cyclic vector $\xi$
  If $A$ has a multiplicative identity $1$, then it is immediate that the equivalence class $\xi$ in the GNS Hilbert space $H$ containing $1$ is a cyclic vector for the above representation. If $A$ is non-unital, take an approximate identity $\{e_\lambda\}$ for $A$. Since positive linear functionals are bounded, the equivalence classes of the net $\{e_\lambda\}$ converges to some vector $\xi$ in $H$, which is a cyclic vector for $\pi$.
  It is clear from the definition of the inner product on the GNS Hilbert space $H$ that the state $\rho$ can be recovered as a vector state on $H$. This proves the theorem.

The method used to produce a $*$-representation from a state of $A$ in the proof of the above theorem is called the GNS construction. For a state of a $C^*$-algebra $A$, the corresponding GNS representation is essentially uniquely determined by the condition, $\rho(a) = \langle \pi(a) \xi, \xi \rangle$ as seen in the theorem below.

Theorem.—Given a state $\rho$ of $A$, let $\pi$, $\pi'$ be $*$-representations of $A$ on Hilbert spaces $H$, $H^\prime$ respectively each with unit norm cyclic vectors $\xi \in H$, $\xi' \in H'$ such that $\rho(a) = \langle \pi(a) \xi, \xi \rangle = \langle \pi'(a) \xi ', \xi ' \rangle$ for all $a \in A$. Then $\pi$, $\pi'$ are unitarily equivalent $*$-representations i.e. there is a unitary operator $U$ from $H$ to $H^\prime$ such that $\pi'(a) = U \pi(a) U^*$ for all $a$ in $A$. The operator $U$ that implements the unitary equivalence maps $\pi(a)\xi$ to $\pi'(a)\xi'$ for all $a$ in $A$.

=== Significance of the GNS construction ===
The GNS construction is at the heart of the proof of the Gelfand–Naimark theorem characterizing $C^*$-algebras as algebras of operators. A $C^*$-algebra has sufficiently many pure states (see below) so that the direct sum of corresponding irreducible GNS representations is faithful.

The direct sum of the corresponding GNS representations of all states is called the universal representation of $A$. The universal representation of $A$ contains every cyclic representation. As every $*$-representation is a direct sum of cyclic representations, it follows that every $*$-representation of $A$ is a direct summand of some sum of copies of the universal representation.

If $\Phi$ is the universal representation of a $C^*$-algebra $A$, the closure of $\Phi(A)$ in the weak operator topology is called the enveloping von Neumann algebra of $A$. It can be identified with the double dual $A^{**}$.

== Irreducibility ==
Also of significance is the relation between irreducible $*$-representations and extreme points of the convex set of states. A representation π on $H$ is irreducible if and only if there are no closed subspaces of $H$ which are invariant under all the operators $\pi(x)$ other than $H$ itself and the trivial subspace $\{0\}$.

Theorem—The set of states of a $C^*$-algebra $A$ with a unit element is a compact convex set under the weak-$*$ topology. In general, (regardless of whether or not $A$ has a unit element) the set of positive functionals of norm $\leq 1$ is a compact convex set.

Both of these results follow immediately from the Banach–Alaoglu theorem.

In the unital commutative case, for the $C^*$-algebra $C(X)$ of continuous functions on some compact $X$, Riesz–Markov–Kakutani representation theorem says that the positive functionals of norm $\leq 1$ are precisely the Borel positive measures on $X$ with total mass $\leq 1$. It follows from Krein–Milman theorem that the extremal states are the Dirac point-mass measures.

On the other hand, a representation of $C(X)$ is irreducible if and only if it is one-dimensional. Therefore, the GNS representation of $C(X)$ corresponding to a measure $\mu$ is irreducible if and only if $\mu$ is an extremal state. This is in fact true for $C^*$-algebras in general.

Theorem—Let $A$ be a $C^*$-algebra. If $\pi$ is a $*$-representation of $A$ on the Hilbert space $H$ with unit norm cyclic vector $\xi$, then $\pi$ is irreducible if and only if the corresponding state $f$ is an extreme point of the convex set of positive linear functionals on $A$ of norm $\leq 1$.

To prove this result one notes first that a representation is irreducible if and only if the commutant of $\pi(A)$, denoted by $\pi(A)'$, consists of scalar multiples of the identity.

Any positive linear functionals $g$ on $A$ dominated by $f$ is of the form
$$g(x^*x) = \langle \pi(x) \xi,  \pi(x) T_g \, \xi \rangle$$
for some positive operator $T_g$ in $\pi(A)'$ with $0 \leq T \leq 1$ in the operator order. This is a version of the Radon–Nikodym theorem.

For such $g$, one can write $f$ as a sum of positive linear functionals: $f = g + g'$. So $\pi$ is unitarily equivalent to a subrepresentation of $\pi_g \oplus \pi_{g'}$. This shows that π is irreducible if and only if any such $\pi_g$ is unitarily equivalent to $\pi$, i.e. $g$ is a scalar multiple of $f$, which proves the theorem.

Extremal states are usually called pure states. Note that a state is a pure state if and only if it is extremal in the convex set of states.

The theorems above for $C^*$-algebras are valid more generally in the context of $B^*$-algebras with approximate identity.

== Generalizations ==
The Stinespring factorization theorem characterizing completely positive maps is an important generalization of the GNS construction.

== History ==
Gelfand and Naimark's paper on the Gelfand–Naimark theorem was published in 1943. Segal recognized the construction that was implicit in this work and presented it in sharpened form.

In his paper of 1947 Segal showed that it is sufficient, for any physical system that can be described by an algebra of operators on a Hilbert space, to consider the irreducible representations of a $C^*$-algebra. In quantum theory this means that the $C^*$-algebra is generated by the observables. This, as Segal pointed out, had been shown earlier by John von Neumann only for the specific case of the non-relativistic Schrödinger-Heisenberg theory.

== See also ==
- Cyclic and separating vector
- KSGNS construction
