= Centralizer and normalizer =

Special types of subgroups encountered in group theory

In mathematics, especially group theory, the centralizer (also called commutant) of a subset S in a group G is the set $\operatorname{C}_G(S)$ of elements of G that commute with every element of S, or equivalently, the set of elements $g\in G$ such that conjugation by $g$ leaves each element of S fixed. The normalizer of S in G is the set of elements $\mathrm{N}_G(S)$ of G that satisfy the weaker condition of leaving the set $S \subseteq G$ fixed under conjugation. The centralizer and normalizer of S are subgroups of G. Many techniques in group theory are based on studying the centralizers and normalizers of suitable subsets S.

Suitably formulated, the definitions also apply to semigroups.

In ring theory, the centralizer of a subset of a ring is defined with respect to the multiplication of the ring (a semigroup operation). The centralizer of a subset of a ring R is a subring of R. This article also deals with centralizers and normalizers in a Lie algebra.

The idealizer in a semigroup or ring is another construction that is in the same vein as the centralizer and normalizer.

== Definitions ==
=== Group and semigroup ===
The centralizer of a subset $S$ of group (or semigroup) G is defined as

$$\mathrm{C}_G(S) = \left\{g \in G \mid gs = sg \text{ for all } s \in S\right\} = \left\{g \in G \mid gsg^{-1} = s \text{ for all } s \in S\right\},$$

where only the first definition applies to semigroups. If there is no ambiguity about the group in question, the G can be suppressed from the notation. When $S=\{a\}$ is a singleton set, we write C_{G}(a) instead of C_{G}({a}). Another less common notation for the centralizer is Z(a), which parallels the notation for the center. With this latter notation, one must be careful to avoid confusion between the center of a group G, Z(G), and the centralizer of an element g in G, Z(g).

The normalizer of S in the group (or semigroup) G is defined as

$$\mathrm{N}_G(S) = \left\{ g \in G \mid gS = Sg \right\} = \left\{g \in G \mid gSg^{-1} = S\right\},$$

where again only the first definition applies to semigroups. If the set $S$ is a subgroup of $G$, then the normalizer $N_G(S)$ is the largest subgroup $G' \subseteq G$ where $S$ is a normal subgroup of $G'$. The definitions of centralizer and normalizer are similar but not identical. If g is in the centralizer of $S$ and s is in $S$, then it must be that gs = sg, but if g is in the normalizer, then gs = tg for some t in $S$, with t possibly different from s. That is, elements of the centralizer of $S$ must commute pointwise with $S$, but elements of the normalizer of S need only commute with S as a set. The same notational conventions mentioned above for centralizers also apply to normalizers. The normalizer should not be confused with the normal closure.

Clearly $C_G(S) \subseteq N_G(S)$ and both are subgroups of $G$.

=== Ring, algebra over a field, Lie ring, and Lie algebra ===
If R is a ring or an algebra over a field, and $S$ is a subset of R, then the centralizer of $S$ is exactly as defined for groups, with R in the place of G.

If $\mathfrak{L}$ is a Lie algebra (or Lie ring) with Lie product [x, y], then the centralizer of a subset $S$ of $\mathfrak{L}$ is defined to be

$$\mathrm{C}_{\mathfrak{L}}(S) = \{ x \in \mathfrak{L} \mid [x, s] = 0 \text{ for all } s \in S \}.$$

The definition of centralizers for Lie rings is linked to the definition for rings in the following way. If R is an associative ring, then R can be given the bracket product [x, y] = xy − yx. Of course then xy = yx if and only if [x, y] = 0. If we denote the set R with the bracket product as L_{R}, then clearly the ring centralizer of $S$ in R is equal to the Lie ring centralizer of $S$ in L_{R}.

The Lie bracket can also be viewed as an operation of the set $\mathfrak{L}$ on itself, because $[*,*]:\mathfrak{L}\times\mathfrak{L}\rightarrow\mathfrak{L}$. The Lie bracket makes $(\mathfrak{L},[*,*])$ a group and its centralizer would then be all elements $\{ x \in \mathfrak{L} \mid [x, s] = [s, x] \text{ for all } s \in S \}.$ However, since the Lie bracket is alternating, this condition is equivalent to $\{ x \in \mathfrak{L} \mid [x, s] = 0 \text{ for all } s \in S \}.$ Thus, the centralizer is defined in the same way for Lie algebras as for groups.

The normalizer of a subset $S$ of a Lie algebra (or Lie ring) $\mathfrak{L}$ is given by

$$\mathrm{N}_\mathfrak{L}(S) = \{ x \in \mathfrak{L} \mid [x, s] \in S \text{ for all } s \in S \}.$$

While this is the standard usage of the term "normalizer" in Lie algebra, this construction is actually the idealizer of the set $S$ in $\mathfrak{L}$. If $S$ is an additive subgroup of $\mathfrak{L}$, then $\mathrm{N}_{\mathfrak{L}}(S)$ is the largest Lie subring (or Lie subalgebra, as the case may be) in which $S$ is a Lie ideal.

== Example ==
Consider the group

$G = S_3 = \{[1, 2, 3], [1, 3, 2], [2, 1, 3], [2, 3, 1], [3, 1, 2], [3, 2, 1]\}$ (the symmetric group of permutations of 3 elements).

Take a subset $H$ of the group $G$:

$$H = \{[1, 2, 3], [1, 3, 2]\}.$$

Note that $[1, 2, 3]$ is the identity permutation in $G$ and retains the order of each element and $[1, 3, 2]$ is the permutation that fixes the first element and swaps the second and third element.

The normalizer of $H$ with respect to the group $G$ are all elements of $G$ that yield the set $H$ (potentially permuted) when the element conjugates $H$. Working out the example for each element of $G$:

$[1, 2, 3]$ when applied to $H$: $\{[1, 2, 3], [1, 3, 2]\} = H$; therefore $[1, 2, 3]$ is in the normalizer $N_G(H)$.
$[1, 3, 2]$ when applied to $H$: $\{[1, 2, 3], [1, 3, 2]\} = H$; therefore $[1, 3, 2]$ is in the normalizer $N_G(H)$.
$[2, 1, 3]$ when applied to $H$: $\{[1, 2, 3], [3, 2, 1]\} \neq H$; therefore $[2, 1, 3]$ is not in the normalizer $N_G(H)$.
$[2, 3, 1]$ when applied to $H$: $\{[1, 2, 3], [2, 1, 3]\} \neq H$; therefore $[2, 3, 1]$ is not in the normalizer $N_G(H)$.
$[3, 1, 2]$ when applied to $H$: $\{[1, 2, 3], [3, 2, 1]\} \neq H$; therefore $[3, 1, 2]$ is not in the normalizer $N_G(H)$.
$[3, 2, 1]$ when applied to $H$: $\{[1, 2, 3], [2, 1, 3]\} \neq H$; therefore $[3, 2, 1]$ is not in the normalizer $N_G(H)$.

Therefore, the normalizer $N_G(H)$ of $H$ in $G$ is $\{[1, 2, 3], [1, 3, 2]\}$ since both these group elements preserve the set $H$ under conjugation.

The centralizer of the group $G$ is the set of elements that leave each element of $H$ unchanged by conjugation; that is, the set of elements that commutes with every element in $H$. It's clear in this example that the only such element in S_{3} is $H$ itself ([1, 2, 3], [1, 3, 2]).

== Properties ==
=== Semigroups ===
Let $S'$ denote the centralizer of $S$ in the semigroup $A$; i.e. $S' = \{x \in A \mid sx = xs \text{ for every } s \in S\}.$ Then $S'$ forms a subsemigroup and $S' = S''' = S'''''$; i.e. a commutant is its own bicommutant.

=== Groups ===
- The centralizer and normalizer of $S$ are both subgroups of G.
- Clearly, C_{G}(S) ⊆ N_{G}(S). In fact, C_{G}(S) is always a normal subgroup of N_{G}(S), being the kernel of the homomorphism N_{G}(S) → Bij(S) and the group N_{G}(S)/C_{G}(S) acts by conjugation as a group of bijections on S. E.g. the Weyl group of a compact Lie group G with a torus T is defined as W(G,T) = N_{G}(T)/C_{G}(T), and especially if the torus is maximal (i.e. C_{G}(T) = T) it is a central tool in the theory of Lie groups.
- C_{G}(C_{G}(S)) contains $S$, but C_{G}(S) need not contain $S$. Containment occurs exactly when $S$ is abelian.
- If H is a subgroup of G, then N_{G}(H) contains H.
- If H is a subgroup of G, then the largest subgroup of G in which H is normal is the subgroup N_{G}(H).
- If $S$ is a subset of G such that all elements of S commute with each other, then the largest subgroup of G whose center contains $S$ is the subgroup C_{G}(S).
- A subgroup H of a group G is called a self-normalizing subgroup of G if N_{G}(H) = H.
- The center of G is exactly C_{G}(G) and G is an abelian group if and only if C_{G}(G) = Z(G) = G.
- For singleton sets, C_{G}(a) = N_{G}(a).
- By symmetry, if $S$ and T are two subsets of G, T ⊆ C_{G}(S) if and only if S ⊆ C_{G}(T).
- For a subgroup H of group G, the N/C theorem states that the factor group N_{G}(H)/C_{G}(H) is isomorphic to a subgroup of Aut(H), the group of automorphisms of H. Since N_{G}(G) = G and C_{G}(G) = Z(G), the N/C theorem also implies that G/Z(G) is isomorphic to Inn(G), the subgroup of Aut(G) consisting of all inner automorphisms of G.
- If we define a group homomorphism T : G → Inn(G) by T(x)(g) = T_{x}(g) = xgx^{−1}, then we can describe N_{G}(S) and C_{G}(S) in terms of the group action of Inn(G) on G: the stabilizer of $S$ in Inn(G) is T(N_{G}(S)), and the subgroup of Inn(G) fixing $S$ pointwise is T(C_{G}(S)).
- A subgroup H of a group G is said to be C-closed or self-bicommutant if H = C_{G}(S) for some subset S ⊆ G. If so, then in fact, H = C_{G}(C_{G}(H)).

=== Rings and algebras over a field ===
- Centralizers in rings and in algebras over a field are subrings and subalgebras over a field, respectively; centralizers in Lie rings and in Lie algebras are Lie subrings and Lie subalgebras, respectively.
- The normalizer of $S$ in a Lie ring contains the centralizer of $S$.
- C_{R}(C_{R}(S)) contains $S$ but is not necessarily equal. The double centralizer theorem deals with situations where equality occurs.
- If $S$ is an additive subgroup of a Lie ring A, then N_{A}(S) is the largest Lie subring of A in which $S$ is a Lie ideal.
- If $S$ is a Lie subring of a Lie ring A, then S ⊆ N_{A}(S).

== See also ==
- Commutator
- Multipliers and centralizers (Banach spaces)
- Stabilizer subgroup
