= Operator system =

Given a unital C*-algebra $\mathcal{A}$, a *-closed subspace S containing 1 is called an operator system. One can associate to each subspace $\mathcal{M} \subseteq \mathcal{A}$ of a unital C*-algebra an operator system via $S:= \mathcal{M}+\mathcal{M}^* +\mathbb{C} 1$.

The appropriate morphisms between operator systems are completely positive maps.

By a theorem of Choi and Effros, operator systems can be characterized as *-vector spaces equipped with an Archimedean matrix order.

== See also ==
- Operator space
