= Enveloping von Neumann algebra =

Type of algebra

In the theory of operator algebras, the enveloping von Neumann algebra of a C*-algebra is a von Neumann algebra that, in some sense, contains all the operator-algebraic information about the given C*-algebra. This is sometimes called the universal enveloping von Neumann algebra, since it is given by a universal property; and (as always with von Neumann algebras) the term W*-algebra may be used in place of von Neumann algebra.

== Definition ==
Suppose that A is a C*-algebra and π_{U} its universal representation, acting on the Hilbert space H_{U}. The image of π_{U}, denoted π_{U}(A), is a C*-subalgebra of bounded operators on H_{U}. The enveloping von Neumann algebra of A is defined to be the closure of π_{U}(A) in the weak operator topology (equivalently, by the von Neumann bicommutant theorem, the enveloping von Neumann algebra is given by π_{U}(A)′′). It is sometimes denoted by A′′.

== Properties ==
The universal representation π_{U} and A′′ together satisfy the following universal property: for any representation π, there is a unique *-homomorphism

$$\Phi: \pi_U(A)'' \rightarrow \pi(A)''$$

that is continuous in the weak operator topology and such that the restriction of Φ to π_{U}(A) is π.

As a particular case, one can consider the continuous functional calculus, whose unique extension gives a canonical Borel functional calculus.

By the Sherman–Takeda theorem, the double dual of a C*-algebra A, A**, can be identified with A′′, as Banach spaces.

Every representation of A uniquely determines a central projection (i.e. a projection in the center of the algebra) in A′′; it is called the central cover or support projection of that representation.

== See also ==
- Universal enveloping algebra
