= Mark Naimark =

Soviet mathematician (1909–1978)

Mark Aronovich Naimark
- Марк Ароно́вич Наймарк
- Born: 5 December 1909; Odessa, Russian Empire
- Died: 30 December 1978 (aged 69); Moscow, USSR
- Resting place: Kuntsevo Cemetery, Moscow
- Education: Odessa University
- Known for: Gelfand–Naimark theorem; Gelfand–Naimark–Segal construction; Naimark's dilation theorem
- Spouse: Larisa Petrovna Shcherbakova
- Children: 2
- Scientific career
- Workplaces: Semenov Institute of Chemical Physics; Moscow Institute of Physics and Technology; Steklov Institute of Mathematics
- Thesis: The theory of normal operators in Hilbert space (1936)
- Academic advisors: Mark Krein
- Doctoral students: Khairulla Murtazin

Mark Aronovich Naimark (Russian: Марк Ароно́вич Наймарк; 5 December 1909 – 30 December 1978) was a Soviet mathematician who made important contributions to functional analysis and mathematical physics.

== Life ==
Naimark was born on 5 December 1909 in Odessa, part of modern-day Ukraine, but which was then part of the Russian Empire, to a Jewish family. His father was Aron Iakovlevich Naimark, a professional artist, and his mother Zefir Moiseevna. He was four years old at the onset of World War I in 1914, and seven when the tumultuous Russian Revolution began in 1917. Showing an early talent for mathematics, Naimark enrolled in a technical college at the age of fifteen in 1924 soon after the Russian Civil War had ended. There he studied while working at a foundry until enrolling in the Physics and Mathematics faculty at Odessa Institute of National Education in 1929. He married his wife Larisa Petrovna Shcherbakova in 1932, with whom he had two sons.

In 1933, Naimark began graduate studies at Odessa State University in the Department of the Theory of Functions. He was supervised by the functional analyst Mark Krein, completing his candidate's dissertation in 1936. Krein was at the time still a young mathematician, only two years older than Naimark, but had already built a research group in functional analysis, and they worked together on some of Naimark's first works on symmetric and Hermitian forms. In 1938 Naimark began his doctoral studies at the Steklov Institute of Mathematics, where he developed his renowned work on self-adjoint extensions of symmetric operators, and began a collaboration with Israel Gelfand that lasted for over a decade. He received his doctorate in 1941, and was made a chair at the Seismological Institute of the USSR Academy of Sciences.

In 1941 Hitler invaded the Soviet Union, and in the same year the Romanian and German occupation of Ukraine led to a massacre in Naimark's hometown. Naimark joined special duty (called "home-guard") during the war and worked on the labor front, moving to Tashkent with the Seismological Institute at the end of 1941 as the Nazi army advanced on Moscow, where he remained until 1943.

After the war Naimark returned to Moscow, where he worked in various institutes, and in 1954 became a professor in the Department of Mathematics at the Physico-Technical Institute of Moscow. He was appointed a professor at the Steklov Institute of Mathematics in 1962, where he stayed for the remainder of his career, and supervised seven doctoral students. During the writing of his last book, Theory of group representations, Naimark was too sick to write by himself, and so completed it by dictation to his wife. Naimark died on 30 December 1978 at age 69 after a prolonged illness, and was buried in Kuntsevo Cemetery in Moscow. He had written 123 papers and five books.

== Work ==
Naimark's interests were formed in the 1930s during a golden age of functional analysis in the USSR. His early work with Krein included development of the theory of separation of roots of algebraic equations. Naimark also began to take interest in pedagogical techniques at this time, an interest that stayed with him for the rest of his life. After moving to the Steklov Institute of Mathematics for his D.Sc. Naimark worked intensively on spectral theory, extensions of symmetric operators, and the representation theory of locally compact operators. His collaboration with Israel Gelfand in the 1930s and 1940s led to several fundamental results in functional analysis, including the 1943 Gelfand–Naimark theorem and the GNS theorem.

During his service in World War II Naimark wrote several papers on seismology and helped to develop the Spectral theory of ordinary differential equations. He worked especially on second-order singular differential operators with a continuous spectrum, using eigenfunctions to describe their spectral decompositions and studying the concept of a spectral singularity. His results are summarized in the monograph Linear Differential Operators, which was published in 1954.

In 1956 Naimark published his monograph Normed Rings which gave the first comprehensive treatment of Banach algebras and was enormously influential in the development of the field. His 1958 monograph Linear representations of the Lorentz group helped to develop the theory of representations of the fundamental series of the complex classical groups, beginning with SL(2,C). With Zhelobenko he later generalized these results to all complex semisimple Lie groups. In the 1960s Naimark's interests focused more intensively on the representation theory of groups and algebras in spaces with an indefinite metric, which became the subject of his last (1976) monograph, The theory of group representations.

Naimark's name is associated with several important ideas in functional analysis:

- The Gelfand–Naimark theorem on the representation of C*-algebras by bounded operators
- Naimark's dilation theorem on extensions of symmetric operators
- The Gelfand–Naimark–Segal construction (the GNS construction) establishing a correspondence between cyclic *-representations and linear functionals
- Naimark's problem on the irreducible representations of C*-algebras in terms of compact operators on a Hilbert space.
- Naimark equivalence of two group representations on a Banach space

== Selected publications ==
- Unitary representations of the classical groups (with I. M. Gelfand, 1950)
- Linear Differential operators, 1954
- Normed Rings, 1956
- Linear Representations of the Lorentz Group, 1958
- Theory of Group Representations, 1976

(all the above English-language books were originally written in Russian)

== See also ==
- Naimark's problem
- Naimark's dilation theorem
- GNS theorem
- Gelfand–Naimark theorem
- Naimark equivalence
