= Gelfand–Naimark theorem =

Mathematics theorem in functional analysis

In mathematics, the Gelfand–Naimark theorem states that an arbitrary C*-algebra is isometrically *-isomorphic to a C*-subalgebra of bounded operators on a Hilbert space. This result was proven by Israel Gelfand and Mark Naimark in 1943 and was a significant point in the development of the theory of C*-algebras since it established the possibility of considering a C*-algebra as an abstract algebraic entity without reference to particular realizations as an operator algebra.

== Details ==
Given a C*-algebra A, its Gelfand–Naimark representation π is the Hilbert space analogue of the direct sum of representations π_{f} of A where f ranges over the set of pure states of A and π_{f} is the irreducible representation associated to f by the GNS construction. Thus the Gelfand–Naimark representation acts on the Hilbert direct sum of the Hilbert spaces H_{f} by

$$\pi(x) [\bigoplus_{f} H_f] = \bigoplus_{f} \pi_f(x)H_f.$$

π(x) is a bounded linear operator since it is the direct sum of a family of operators, each one having norm ≤ ||x||.

Theorem. The Gelfand–Naimark representation of a C*-algebra is an isometric *-representation.

It suffices to show the map π is injective, since for *-morphisms of C*-algebras injective implies isometric. Let x be a non-zero element of A. By the Krein extension theorem for positive linear functionals, there is a state f on A such that f(z) ≥ 0 for all non-negative z in A and f(−x* x) < 0. Consider the GNS representation π_{f} with cyclic vector ξ. Since

$$\begin{align}
\|\pi_f(x) \xi\|^2 & = \langle \pi_f(x) \xi \mid \pi_f(x) \xi \rangle
= \langle \xi \mid \pi_f(x^*) \pi_f(x) \xi \rangle \\[6pt]
& = \langle \xi \mid \pi_f(x^* x) \xi \rangle= f(x^* x) > 0,
\end{align}$$

it follows that π_{f} (x) ≠ 0, so π (x) ≠ 0, so π is injective.

The construction of Gelfand–Naimark representation depends only on the GNS construction and therefore it is meaningful for any Banach *-algebra A having an approximate identity. In general (when A is not a C*-algebra) it will not be a faithful representation. The closure of the image of π(A) will be a C*-algebra of operators called the C*-enveloping algebra of A. Equivalently, we can define the C*-enveloping algebra as follows: Define a real valued function on A by

$$\|x\|_{\operatorname{C}^*} = \sup_f \sqrt{f(x^* x)}$$

as f ranges over pure states of A. This is a semi-norm, which we refer to as the C* semi-norm of A. The set I of elements of A whose semi-norm is 0 forms a two sided-ideal in A closed under involution. Thus the quotient vector space A / I is an involutive algebra and the norm

$$\| \cdot \|_{\operatorname{C}^*}$$

factors through a norm on A / I, which except for completeness, is a C* norm on A / I (these are sometimes called pre-C*-norms). Taking the completion of A / I relative to this pre-C*-norm produces a C*-algebra B.

By the Krein–Milman theorem one can show without too much difficulty that for x an element of the Banach *-algebra A having an approximate identity:

$$\sup_{f \in \operatorname{State}(A)} f(x^*x) = \sup_{f \in \operatorname{PureState}(A)} f(x^*x).$$

It follows that an equivalent form for the C* norm on A is to take the above supremum over all states.

The universal construction is also used to define universal C*-algebras of isometries.

Remark. The Gelfand representation or Gelfand isomorphism for a commutative C*-algebra with unit $A$ is an isometric *-isomorphism from $A$ to the algebra of continuous complex-valued functions on the space of multiplicative linear functionals, which in the commutative case are precisely the pure states, of A with the weak* topology.

== See also ==
- GNS construction
- Stinespring factorization theorem
- Gelfand–Raikov theorem
- Koopman operator
- Tannaka–Krein duality
