= Naimark's dilation theorem =

In operator theory, Naimark's dilation theorem (Note: In the physics literature, it is common to see the spelling “Neumark” instead of “Naimark.” The latter variant is according to the romanization of Russian used in translation of Soviet journals, with diacritics omitted (originally Naĭmark). The former is according to the etymology of the surname of Mark Naimark.) is a result that characterizes positive operator valued measures. It is named after Mark Naimark from his 1943 work. It can be viewed as a consequence of the Stinespring dilation theorem.

== Some preliminary notions ==
Let X be a compact Hausdorff space, H be a Hilbert space, and L(H) the Banach space of bounded operators on H. A mapping E from the Borel σ-algebra on X to $L(H)$ is called an operator-valued measure if it is weakly countably additive, that is, for any disjoint sequence of Borel sets $\{ B_i \}$, we have

$$\langle E (\cup _i B_i) x, y \rangle = \sum_i \langle E (B_i) x, y \rangle$$

for all x and y. Some terminology for describing such measures are:

- E is called regular if the scalar valued measure

$$B \rightarrow \langle E (B) x, y \rangle$$

is a regular Borel measure, meaning all compact sets have finite total variation and the measure of a set can be approximated by those of open sets.

- E is called bounded if $|E| = \sup_B \|E(B) \| < \infty$.
- E is called positive if E(B) is a positive operator for all B.
- E is called self-adjoint if E(B) is self-adjoint for all B.
- E is called spectral if it is self-adjoint and $E (B_1 \cap B_2) = E(B_1) E(B_2)$ for all $B_1, B_2$.

We will assume throughout that E is regular.

Let C(X) denote the abelian C*-algebra of continuous functions on X. If E is regular and bounded, it induces a map $\Phi _E : C(X) \rightarrow L(H)$ in the obvious way:

$$\langle \Phi _E (f) h_1 , h_2 \rangle = \int _X f(x) \langle E(dx) h_1, h_2 \rangle$$

The boundedness of E implies, for all h of unit norm

$$\langle \Phi _E (f) h , h \rangle = \int _X f(x)  \langle E(dx) h, h \rangle \leq \| f \|_\infty \cdot |E| .$$

This shows $\; \Phi _E (f)$ is a bounded operator for all f, and $\Phi _E$ itself is a bounded linear map as well.

The properties of $\Phi_E$ are directly related to those of E:

- If E is positive, then $\Phi_E$, viewed as a map between C*-algebras, is also positive.
- $\Phi_E$ is a homomorphism if, by definition, for all continuous f on X and $h_1, h_2 \in H$,

$$\langle \Phi_E (fg) h_1, h_2 \rangle = \int _X f(x) \cdot g(x) \; \langle E(dx) h_1, h_2 \rangle
= \langle \Phi_E (f) \Phi_E (g) h_1 , h_2 \rangle.$$

Take f and g to be indicator functions of Borel sets and we see that $\Phi _E$ is a homomorphism if and only if E is spectral.

- Similarly, to say $\Phi_E$ respects the * operation means

$$\langle \Phi_E ( {\bar f} ) h_1, h_2 \rangle = \langle \Phi_E (f) ^* h_1 , h_2 \rangle.$$

The LHS is

$$\int _X {\bar f} \; \langle E(dx) h_1, h_2 \rangle,$$

and the RHS is

$$\langle h_1, \Phi_E (f) h_2 \rangle = \overline{\langle \Phi_E(f) h_2, h_1 \rangle} = \int _X {\bar f}(x) \; \overline{\langle E(dx) h_2, h_1 \rangle} =  \int _X {\bar f}(x) \; \langle h_1, E(dx) h_2 \rangle$$

So, taking f a sequence of continuous functions increasing to the indicator function of B, we get $\langle E(B) h_1, h_2 \rangle = \langle h_1, E(B) h_2 \rangle$, i.e. E(B) is self adjoint.

- Combining the previous two facts gives the conclusion that $\Phi _E$ is a *-homomorphism if and only if E is spectral and self adjoint. (When E is spectral and self adjoint, E is said to be a projection-valued measure or PVM.)

== Naimark's theorem ==
The theorem reads as follows: Let E be a positive L(H)-valued measure on X. There exists a Hilbert space K, a bounded operator $V: K \rightarrow H$, and a self-adjoint, spectral L(K)-valued measure F on X, such that

$$\; E(B) = V F(B) V^*.$$

=== Proof ===
We now sketch the proof. The argument passes E to the induced map $\Phi_E$ and uses Stinespring's dilation theorem. Since E is positive, so is $\Phi_E$ as a map between C*-algebras, as explained above. Furthermore, because the domain of $\Phi _E$, C(X), is an abelian C*-algebra, we have that $\Phi_E$ is completely positive. By Stinespring's result, there exists a Hilbert space K, a *-homomorphism $\pi : C(X) \rightarrow L(K)$, and operator $V: K \rightarrow H$ such that

$$\; \Phi_E(f) = V \pi (f) V^*.$$

Since π is a *-homomorphism, its corresponding operator-valued measure F is spectral and self adjoint. It is easily seen that F has the desired properties.

== Finite-dimensional case ==
In the finite-dimensional case, there is a somewhat more explicit formulation.

Suppose now $X = \{1, \dotsc, n \}$, therefore C(X) is the finite-dimensional algebra $\mathbb{C}^n$, and H has finite dimension m. A positive operator-valued measure E then assigns each i a positive semidefinite m × m matrix $E_i$. Naimark's theorem now states that there is a projection-valued measure on X whose restriction is E.

Of particular interest is the special case when $\sum_i E_i = I$ where I is the identity operator. (See the article on POVM for relevant applications.) In this case, the induced map $\Phi_E$ is unital. It can be assumed with no loss of generality that each $E_i$ takes the form $x_ix_i^*$ for some potentially subnormalized vector $x_i \in \mathbb{C}^m$. Under such assumptions, the case $n < m$ is excluded and we must have either

1. $n = m$ and E is already a projection-valued measure (because $\sum_{i=1}^n x_i x_i^* = I$ if and only if $\{x_i\}$ is an orthonormal basis),
2. $n > m$ and $\{ E_i \}$ does not consist of mutually orthogonal projections.

For the second possibility, the problem of finding a suitable projection-valued measure now becomes the following problem. By assumption, the non-square matrix

$$M = \begin{bmatrix} x_1 \cdots x_n \end{bmatrix}$$

is a co-isometry, that is $M M^* = I$. If we can find a $(n-m) \times n$ matrix N where

$$U = \begin{bmatrix} M \\ N \end{bmatrix}$$

is a n × n unitary matrix, the projection-valued measure whose elements are projections onto the column vectors of U will then have the desired properties. In principle, such a N can always be found.
