= Approximate identity =

Net in a normed algebra

In mathematics, particularly in functional analysis and ring theory, an approximate identity is a net in a Banach algebra or ring (generally without an identity) that acts as a substitute for an identity element.

== Definition ==
A right approximate identity in a Banach algebra A is a net $\{e_\lambda : \lambda \in \Lambda\}$ such that for every element a of A, $\lim_{\lambda\in\Lambda}\lVert ae_\lambda - a \rVert = 0.$ Similarly, a left approximate identity in a Banach algebra A is a net $\{e_\lambda : \lambda \in \Lambda\}$ such that for every element a of A, $\lim_{\lambda\in\Lambda}\lVert e_\lambda a - a \rVert = 0.$ An approximate identity is a net which is both a right approximate identity and a left approximate identity.

== C*-algebras ==
For C*-algebras, a right (or left) approximate identity consisting of self-adjoint elements is the same as an approximate identity. The net of all positive elements in A of norm ≤ 1 with its natural order is an approximate identity for any C*-algebra. This is called the canonical approximate identity of a C*-algebra. Approximate identities are not unique. For example, for compact operators acting on a Hilbert space, the net consisting of finite rank projections would be another approximate identity.

If an approximate identity is a sequence, we call it a sequential approximate identity and a C*-algebra with a sequential approximate identity is called σ-unital. Every separable C*-algebra is σ-unital, though the converse is false. A commutative C*-algebra is σ-unital if and only if its spectrum is σ-compact. In general, a C*-algebra A is σ-unital if and only if A contains a strictly positive element, i.e. there exists h in A_{+} such that the hereditary C*-subalgebra generated by h is A.

One sometimes considers approximate identities consisting of specific types of elements. For example, a C*-algebra has real rank zero if and only if every hereditary C*-subalgebra has an approximate identity consisting of projections. This was known as property (HP) in earlier literature.

== Convolution algebras ==
An approximate identity in a convolution algebra plays the same role as a sequence of function approximations to the Dirac delta function (which is the identity element for convolution). For example, the Fejér kernels of Fourier series theory give rise to an approximate identity.

== Rings ==
In ring theory, an approximate identity is defined in a similar way, except that the ring is given the discrete topology so that a = ae_{λ} for some λ.

A module over a ring with approximate identity is called non-degenerate if for every m in the module there is some λ with m = me_{λ}.

== See also ==
- Mollifier
- Nascent delta function
- Summability kernel
