= State (functional analysis) =

In the mathematical field of functional analysis, a state of an operator system is a positive linear functional of norm 1. States in functional analysis generalize the notion of density matrices in quantum mechanics, which represent quantum states, both mixed states and pure states. Density matrices in turn generalize state vectors, which only represent pure states. For M an operator system in a C*-algebra A with identity, the set of all states of M, sometimes denoted by S(M), is convex, weak-* closed in the Banach dual space M^{*}. Thus the set of all states of M with the weak-* topology forms a compact Hausdorff space, known as the state space of M. In the C*-algebraic formulation of quantum mechanics, states in this previous sense correspond to physical states, i.e. mappings from physical observables (self-adjoint elements of the C*-algebra) to their expected measurement outcome (real number).

== Jordan decomposition ==
States can be viewed as noncommutative generalizations of probability measures. By Gelfand representation, every commutative C*-algebra A is of the form C_{0}(X) for some locally compact Hausdorff X. In this case, S(A) consists of positive Radon measures on X, and the pure states are the evaluation functionals on X.

More generally, the GNS construction shows that every state is, after choosing a suitable representation, a vector state.

A bounded linear functional on a C*-algebra A is said to be self-adjoint if it is real-valued on the self-adjoint elements of A. Self-adjoint functionals are noncommutative analogues of signed measures.

The Jordan decomposition in measure theory says that every signed measure can be expressed as the difference of two positive measures supported on disjoint sets. This can be extended to the noncommutative setting.

Theorem—Every self-adjoint $f$ in $A^{\ast}$ can be written as $f = f_{+} - f_{-}$ where $f_{+}$ and $f_{-}$ are positive functionals and $\Vert f \Vert = \Vert f_{+}\Vert + \Vert f_{-}\Vert$.

Proof

A proof can be sketched as follows: Let $\Omega$ be the weak*-compact set of positive linear functionals on $A$ with norm ≤ 1, and $C(\Omega)$ be the continuous functions on $\Omega$.

$A$ can be viewed as a closed linear subspace of $C(\Omega)$ (this is Kadison's function representation). By Hahn–Banach, $f$ extends to a $g$ in $C(\Omega)^{\ast}$ with $\Vert g \Vert = \Vert f \Vert$.

Using results from measure theory quoted above, one has:

$g(\cdot) = \int \cdot \; d \mu$

where, by the self-adjointness of $f$, $\mu$ can be taken to be a signed measure. Write:

$\mu = \mu_+ - \mu_-, \;$

a difference of positive measures. The restrictions of the functionals $\textstyle\int\cdot\;d\mu_{+}$ and $\textstyle\int\cdot\;d\mu_{-}$ to $A$ has the required properties of $f_{+}$ and $f_{-}$. This proves the theorem.

It follows from the above decomposition that A* is the linear span of states.

== Some important classes of states ==
=== Pure states ===
By the Krein-Milman theorem, the state space of M has extreme points. The extreme points of the state space are termed pure states and other states are known as mixed states.

=== Vector states ===
For a Hilbert space H and a vector x in H, the formula ω_{x}(T) := ⟨Tx,x⟩ (for T in B(H)) defines a positive linear functional on B(H). Since ω_{x}(1)=||x||^{2}, ω_{x} is a state if ||x||=1. If A is a C*-subalgebra of B(H) and M an operator system in A, then the restriction of ω_{x} to M defines a positive linear functional on M. The states of M that arise in this manner, from unit vectors in H, are termed vector states of M.

=== Faithful states ===
A state $\tau$ is faithful, if $\tau(a^* a) = 0$ implies $a = 0$.

=== Normal states ===
A state $\tau$ is called normal, iff for every monotone, increasing net $H_\alpha$ of operators with least upper bound $H$, $\tau(H_\alpha)\;$ converges to $\tau(H)\;$.

=== Tracial states ===
A tracial state is a state $\tau$ such that

$$\tau(AB)=\tau (BA)\;.$$

For any separable C*-algebra, the set of tracial states is a Choquet simplex.

=== Factorial states ===
A factorial state of a C*-algebra A is a state such that the commutant of the corresponding GNS representation of A is a factor.

== See also ==
- Quantum state
- Gelfand–Naimark–Segal construction
- Quantum mechanics
  - Quantum state
  - Density matrix
