= Volterra (disambiguation) =

Volterra is a town in Italy.

Volterra may also refer:

== People ==
- Aaron Ḥai Volterra (fl. 18th century), Italian poet and rabbi
- Daniele da Volterra (1509–1566), Italian painter
- Francesco da Volterra, Italian painter
- Vito Volterra (1860–1940), Italian mathematician

== Mathematics ==
- Lotka–Volterra equations, also known as the predator–prey equations
- Smith–Volterra–Cantor set, a Cantor set with measure greater than zero
- Volterra's function, a differentiable function whose derivative is not Riemann integrable
- Volterra integral equation, a generalization of the indefinite integral
- Volterra operator, a bounded linear operator on the space of square integrable functions, the operator corresponding to an indefinite integral
- Volterra series
- Volterra space, a property of topological spaces

== Other ==
- Volterra (crater), a lunar impact crater on the far side of the Moon
- Volterra Semiconductor, an American semiconductor company
- Project Volterra, a compact desktop PC intended to be used as developer kit from Microsoft
