= Mikhail Samuilovich Livsic =

Ukrainian-born Israeli mathematician

- Михаил Самуилович Лившиц
- Born: July 4, 1917; Pokotilova, Uman district, Ukraine
- Died: March 30, 2007 (aged 89); Beersheba, Israel
- Education: Odessa State University
- Known for: Applications of functional analysis to quantum theory, theory of open systems
- Scientific career
- Fields: Functional analysis
- Workplaces: Odessa State University, Hydrometeorological Institute in Odessa, Mining Institute of Kharkiv, University of Kharkiv, Ben-Gurion University of the Negev
- Doctoral advisor: Mark Krein

Mikhail Samuilovich Livsic (Russian: Михаил Самуилович Лившиц; 4 July 1917 – 30 March 2007) was a Ukrainian-born Israeli mathematician who specialized in functional analysis.

== Biography ==
Born in Pokotilova, Uman district on 4 July 1917, Livsic moved to Odessa with his family when he was four years old. His father was an associate professor of mathematics who frequented leading Soviet mathematicians in Odessa like Nikolai Chebotaryov, Veniamin Fedorovich Kagan, Mark Krein and Samuil O. Shatunovsky.

In 1931 Livsic graduated from school was a close friend of the mathematician Israel Markowitsch Glasman (1916–1968) at the school. Both were very interested in philosophy and therefore decided to study natural science and mathematics. After graduation, Livsic attended first a school for radio engineers and from 1933 the newly created Departmenr of Physics and Mathematics of the Odessa State University, with Mark Krein, Mark Naimark and Boris Yakovlevich Lewin as teachers. Krein was one of the major figures of the Soviet school of functional analysis and headed a very active school of functional analysis. Lewin was a prominent Soviet mathematician who made significant contributions to function theory. Study colleagues of Livsic were the fellow mathematicians A.P. Artyomenko, David Milman, Vitold Shmulyan, M.A. Rutman and V.A. Potapov.

Originally, he worked on the moment problem, at that time the main research area of Krein, and with quasi-analytical functions. Soon after, he worked on the theory of operators, inspired by the work of Marshall Stone, John von Neumann, Abraham Plessner and Naum Ilyich Akhiezer .

Following the evacuation of the Odessa State University during the Second World War, Livsic received in 1942 in Maikop his Ph.D. on the application of Hermitian operators theory to the generalised moment problem under supervision of Mark Krein.

In 1945, Livsic passed his habilitation thesis on generalisations of von Neumann's extension theory that was evaluated by prominent mathematicians, namely Stefan Banach, Israel Gelfand, Mark Naimark and Plessner at the Steklov Institute of Mathematics.

Livsic could not return directly to the Odessa State University following the dismantling of Krein's school under the accusation of promoting too many Jewish mathematicians. Livsic himself was considered not being "suited for representing the Ukrainian culture". He taught until 1957 at the Hydrometeorological Institute in Odessa, then at the Mining Institute of Kharkiv. In 1962, he joined the department of mathematical physics at the University of Kharkiv at the invitation of Naum Akhiezer. His study focused on the applications of functional analysis to quantum theory. He worked on the physical interpretation of non-self adjoining operators and he developed a theory of open systems which are physical systems which interact with the environment. These research is compiled in two monographs. After moving to Tbilissi with his family, he started working on a generalisation of the Cayley-Hamilton theorem.

He moved to Israel in 1978 and settled in Beersheba. He became a professor at Ben-Gurion University of the Negev and started to work with Naftali Kravitsky on a theory of several commuting operators.
