= Szlenk index =

Term from functional analysis

The Szlenk index of a Banach space $X$ is an ordinal-valued invariant that measures the complexity of the weak-* topology on the unit ball $B_{X^*}$ of its dual space and is invariant under linear isomorphisms. By the Banach–Alaoglu theorem, this ball is compact with respect to the weak-* topology by the Banach–Alaoglu theorem, which makes it possible to define the Szlenk index by means of a transfinite derivation process

$$\operatorname{Sz}(X) = \sup_{\varepsilon>0}\sup\{ \alpha<\omega_1 : (B_{X^*})_\varepsilon^{(\alpha)}\neq \varnothing \}.$$

The index is named after Wiesław Szlenk who used it to show that there is no separable reflexive Banach space that is universal for the class of all separable reflexive Banach spaces, which was a problem of the Scottish book.

== Szlenk index ==
Let $X$ be a separable Banach space, and let $K \subset X^*$ be a non-empty weak-* compact subset. For $\varepsilon > 0$, define

$$K'_\varepsilon = \{ x^* \in K : \forall\, U \text{ weak-* neighbourhood of } x^*,\ \operatorname{diam}(K \cap U) > \varepsilon \},$$

where $\operatorname{diam}(K \cap U)$ denotes the diameter with respect to the norm.

We define, by transfinite recursion, for every countable ordinal $\alpha$:

$$K^{(0)}_\varepsilon = K,$$
$$K^{(\alpha+1)}_\varepsilon = \bigl(K^{(\alpha)}_\varepsilon\bigr)'_\varepsilon \qquad \text{for } \alpha < \omega_1,$$

and

$$K^{(\lambda)}_\varepsilon = \bigcap_{\alpha < \lambda} K^{(\alpha)}_\varepsilon \qquad \text{if } \lambda < \omega_1 \text{ is a limit ordinal}.$$

Finally, the Szlenk index of $X$ is defined by

$\operatorname{Sz}(X) = \sup_{\varepsilon>0}\sup\{ \alpha<\omega_1 : (B_{X^*})_\varepsilon^{(\alpha)}\neq \varnothing \}.$
