= Hostinský =

Hostinský is a Czech language occupational surname for an innkeeper (Czech: The dictionary definition of hostinský at Wiktionary). Notable people with the name include:

- Bohuslav Hostinský (1884–1951), Czech mathematician and theoretical physicist
- Otakar Hostinský (1847–1910), Czech historian
