= Mazur's lemma =

On strongly convergent combinations of a weakly convergent sequence in a Banach space

In mathematics, Mazur's lemma is a result in the theory of normed vector spaces introduced by Polish mathematician Stanisław Mazur. It shows that any weakly convergent sequence in a normed space has a sequence of convex combinations of its members that converges strongly to the same limit. Mazur's lemma is used in the proof of Tonelli's theorem.

== Statement of the lemma ==
Mazur's theorem—Let $(X, \lVert\cdot\rVert)$ be a normed vector space and let $\left\{x_j\right\}_{j \in \N}\subset X$ be a sequence which converges weakly to some $x\in X$.

Then there exists a sequence $\left\{y_k\right\}_{k \in \N}\subset X$ made up of finite convex combination of the $x_j$'s of the form
$$y_k=\sum_{j\ge k}\lambda_j^{(k)}x_j$$
such that $y_k\to x$ strongly that is $\lVert y_k-x\rVert\to 0$.

For a proof see Ekeland & Temam (1974), p. 6.

== See also ==
- Banach–Alaoglu theorem – Theorem in functional analysis
- Bishop–Phelps theorem
- Eberlein–Šmulian theorem – Relates three different kinds of weak compactness in a Banach space
- James's theorem – Theorem in mathematics
- Goldstine theorem
