= Vadym Adamyan =

Russian mathematician (born 1938)

- Born: 2 December 1938 (age 87); Odessa, USSR
- Education: Odessa I.I Mechnikov National University
- Awards: Mark Krein award (2007)
- Scientific career
- Fields: Mathematics, physics
- Doctoral advisor: Mark Grigorievich Krein

Vadym Movsesovich Adamyan (Armenian: Վադիմ Մովսեսի Ադամյան; Ukrainian: Вадим Мовсесович Адамян; born 2 December 1938) is an Armenian Ukrainian mathematician and theoretical physicist, professor and head of the Department of Theoretical Physics at Odessa University. He is known for his contributions to operator theory and functional analysis.

== Biography ==
Adamyan was born in Odessa on 2 December 1938. In 1956–1961 Adamyan studied at the Odessa I.I.Mechnikov State University. He graduated with a degree in theoretical physics, supervised by Yu. A. Tsvirko. In 1961–1964 he was a PhD student in the Odessa Construction Institute, under the supervision of Mark Grigorievich Krein. From 1964 to 1966 he worked as a senior research fellow at the Odessa Lomonosov Technological Institute.

On 20 June 1966, Adamyan defended his PhD thesis in functional analysis and the theory of functions specialty at the Institute of Mathematics and Mechanics, Yerevan University. He taught at the Department of Mathematics at the Odessa Construction Institute for one year after his thesis defense. Afterwards, he headed a laboratory at the Institute of Physics of Odessa State University until 1975.

On 17 October 1974 Vadym Adamyan defended his doctoral thesis in functional analysis and theory of functions at the Academy of Sciences of the Institute of Mathematics in Kiev. After defending his doctoral thesis, he became an associate professor at Odessa State University, and then, in 1977, full professor. In 1978, he became the head of the Department of Theoretical Physics. Within the department, he stimulated the development of new areas, such as plasma physics, solid state physics and physics of nanostructures (see nanotechnology).

== Research ==
Adamyan's principal fields of research are functional analysis and operator theory. In addition, since 1966 he has been working on different problems of theoretical physics, such as plasma theory and the theory of nanostructures.

Throughout his long scientific activity Professor Adamyan worked in universities in Australia, New Zealand, Germany and Spain and received several honorary degrees and awards. In 1994–1995 he was appointed Soros Professor. Vadym Adamyan is a member of American Mathematical Society (AMS), the Gesellschaft für Angewandte Mathematik und Mechanik (Society of Applied Mathematics and Mechanics) and the Ukrainian Physical Society.
