= Krein–Rutman theorem =

Generalization of the Perron–Frobenius theorem to Banach spaces

In functional analysis, the Krein–Rutman theorem is a generalisation of the Perron–Frobenius theorem to infinite-dimensional Banach spaces. It was proved by Krein and Rutman in 1948.

== Statement ==
Let $X$ be a Banach space, and let $K\subset X$ be a convex cone such that $K\cap -K = \{0\}$, and $K-K$ is dense in $X$, i.e. the closure of the set $\{u - v : u,\,v\in K\}=X$. $K$ is also known as a total cone. Let $T:X\to X$ be a non-zero compact operator, and assume that it is positive, meaning that $T(K)\subset K$, and that its spectral radius $r(T)$ is strictly positive.

Then $r(T)$ is an eigenvalue of $T$ with positive eigenvector, meaning that there exists $u\in K\setminus {0}$ such that $T(u)=r(T)u$.

== De Pagter's theorem ==
If the positive operator $T$ is assumed to be ideal irreducible, namely, there is no ideal $J\ne0$ of $X$ such that $TJ \subset J$, then de Pagter's theorem asserts that $r(T)>0$.

Therefore, for ideal irreducible operators the assumption $r(T)>0$ is not needed.
