= Stieltjes–Wigert polynomials =

In mathematics, Stieltjes–Wigert polynomials (named after Thomas Jan Stieltjes and Carl Severin Wigert) are a family of basic hypergeometric orthogonal polynomials in the basic Askey scheme, for the weight function

$$w(x) = \frac{k}{\sqrt{\pi}} x^{-1/2} \exp(-k^2\log^2 x)$$

on the positive real line x > 0.

The moment problem for the Stieltjes–Wigert polynomials is indeterminate; in other words, there are many other measures giving the same family of orthogonal polynomials (see Krein's condition).

Koekoek et al. (2010) give in Section 14.27 a detailed list of the properties of these polynomials.

== Definition ==
The polynomials are given in terms of basic hypergeometric functions and the Pochhammer symbol by

$$\displaystyle   S_n(x;q) = \frac{1}{(q;q)_n}{}_1\phi_1(q^{-n},0;q,-q^{n+1}x),$$

where

$$q = \exp \left(-\frac{1}{2k^2} \right) .$$

== Orthogonality ==
Since the moment problem for these polynomials is indeterminate there are many different weight functions on [0,∞] for which they are orthogonal. Two examples of such weight functions are

$$\frac{1}{(-x,-qx^{-1};q)_\infty}$$

and

$$\frac{k}{\sqrt{\pi}} x^{-1/2} \exp \left(-k^2 \log^2 x \right) .$$
