= Krein–Smulian theorem =

In mathematics, particularly in functional analysis, the Krein-Smulian theorem can refer to two theorems relating the closed convex hull and compactness in the weak topology. They are named after Mark Krein and Vitold Shmulyan, who published them in 1940.

== Statement ==
Both of the following theorems are referred to as the Krein-Smulian Theorem.

Krein-Smulian Theorem:—Let $X$ be a Banach space and $K$ a weakly compact subset of $X$ (that is, $K$ is compact when $X$ is endowed with the weak topology). Then the closed convex hull of $K$ in $X$ is weakly compact.

Krein-Smulian Theorem—Let $X$ be a Banach space and $A$ a convex subset of the continuous dual space $X^{\prime}$ of $X$. If for all $r > 0,$ $A \cap \left\{x^{\prime} \in X^{\prime} : \left\| x^{\prime} \right\| \leq r\right\}$ is weak-* closed in $X^{\prime}$ then $A$ is weak-* closed.

== See also ==
- Krein–Milman theorem – On when a space equals the closed convex hull of its extreme points
- Weak-* topology – Mathematical term

== Bibliography ==
- Conway, John B. (1990). A Course in Functional Analysis. Graduate Texts in Mathematics. Vol. 96 (2nd ed.). New York: Springer-Verlag. ISBN 978-0-387-97245-9. OCLC 21195908.
- Narici, Lawrence; Beckenstein, Edward (2011). Topological Vector Spaces. Pure and applied mathematics (Second ed.). Boca Raton, FL: CRC Press. ISBN 978-1584888666. OCLC 144216834.
- Rudin, Walter (1991). Functional Analysis. International Series in Pure and Applied Mathematics. Vol. 8 (Second ed.). New York, NY: McGraw-Hill Science/Engineering/Math. ISBN 978-0-07-054236-5. OCLC 21163277.
- Schaefer, Helmut H.; Wolff, Manfred P. (1999). Topological Vector Spaces. GTM. Vol. 8 (Second ed.). New York, NY: Springer New York Imprint Springer. ISBN 978-1-4612-7155-0. OCLC 840278135.
- Trèves, François (2006) [1967]. Topological Vector Spaces, Distributions and Kernels. Mineola, N.Y.: Dover Publications. ISBN 978-0-486-45352-1. OCLC 853623322.
