= Eberlein–Šmulian theorem =

Relates three different kinds of weak compactness in a Banach space

In the mathematical field of functional analysis, the Eberlein–Šmulian theorem (named after William Frederick Eberlein and Witold Lwowitsch Schmulian) is a result that relates three different kinds of weak compactness in a Banach space.

== Statement ==
Eberlein–Šmulian theorem: If X is a Banach space and A is a subset of X, then the following statements are equivalent:

1. each sequence of elements of A has a subsequence that is weakly convergent in X
2. each sequence of elements of A has a weak cluster point in X
3. the weak closure of A is weakly compact.

A set A (in any topological space) can be compact in three different ways:

- Sequential compactness: Every sequence from A has a convergent subsequence whose limit is in A.
- Limit point compactness: Every infinite subset of A has a limit point in A.
- Compactness (or Heine-Borel compactness): Every open cover of A admits a finite subcover.

The Eberlein–Šmulian theorem states that the three are equivalent on a weak topology of a Banach space. While this equivalence is true in general for a metric space, the weak topology is not metrizable in infinite dimensional vector spaces, and so the Eberlein–Šmulian theorem is needed.

== Applications ==
The Eberlein–Šmulian theorem is important in the theory of PDEs, and particularly in Sobolev spaces. Many Sobolev spaces are reflexive Banach spaces and therefore bounded subsets are weakly precompact by Alaoglu's theorem. Thus the theorem implies that bounded subsets are weakly sequentially precompact, and therefore from every bounded sequence of elements of that space it is possible to extract a subsequence which is weakly converging in the space. Since many PDEs only have solutions in the weak sense, this theorem is an important step in deciding which spaces of weak solutions to use in solving a PDE.

== See also ==
- Banach–Alaoglu theorem
- Bishop–Phelps theorem
- Mazur's lemma
- James' theorem
- Goldstine theorem

== Bibliography ==
- Conway, John B. (1990). A Course in Functional Analysis. Graduate Texts in Mathematics. Vol. 96 (2nd ed.). New York: Springer-Verlag. ISBN 978-0-387-97245-9. OCLC 21195908.
- Diestel, Joseph (1984), Sequences and series in Banach spaces, Springer-Verlag, ISBN 0-387-90859-5.
- Dunford, N.; Schwartz, J.T. (1958), Linear operators, Part I, Wiley-Interscience.
- Whitley, R.J. (1967), "An elementary proof of the Eberlein-Smulian theorem", Mathematische Annalen, 172 (2): 116–118, doi:10.1007/BF01350091, S2CID 123175660.
