= Pierre Milman =

Russian mathematician (born 1945)

Pierre D. Milman FRSC (Russian: Пьер Д. Мильман, born 1945) is a mathematician and a professor at the University of Toronto.

Milman graduated with a B.A. from the University of Moscow in 1967. He obtained his Ph.D. from the University of Tel Aviv in 1975 after an interlude of several years as researcher at the Institute of Chemical Physics and then Solid State Physics in Moscow.

== Awards ==
In 1997, he was elected Fellow of the Royal Society of Canada. He was awarded a Killam Research Fellowship in 2002, and the Jeffery–Williams Prize in 2005.

== Family ==
Mathematics runs in the Milman family. His father is the mathematician David Milman, who co-authored the Krein–Milman theorem. His brother is the mathematician Vitali Milman.
