= Von Békésy (crater) =

Crater on the Moon

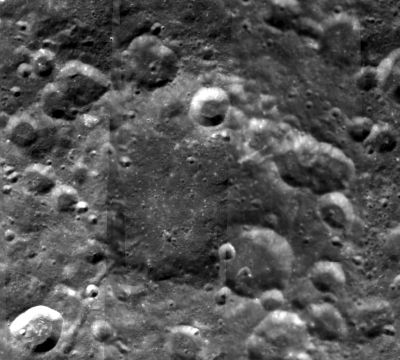
- Clementine mosaic
- Coordinates: 51.9°N 126.8°E
- Diameter: 96 km
- Depth: Unknown
- Colongitude: 235° at sunrise
- Eponym: Georg von Békésy

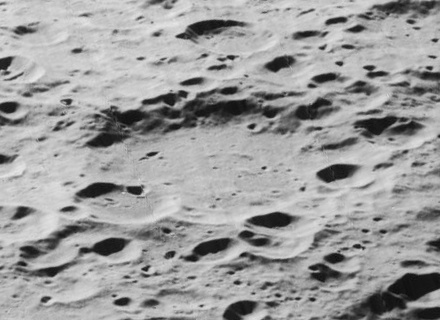
Oblique Lunar Orbiter 5 image

Von Békésy is a worn lunar impact crater on the far side of the Moon. It is located in the northern latitudes, behind the northeastern limb of the Moon as seen from the Earth. This is a relatively isolated crater formation, the closest named crater being Volterra, just over one crater diameter to the north-northeast. To the southwest lies Millikan.

This crater has been heavily eroded by subsequent impacts, and several portions of the rim are overlaid by smaller craters. The largest of these is laid across the southeastern rim. There are multiple smaller craters along the northeastern and the western rims. The interior floor is relatively featureless, with only a few tiny craterlets to mark the surface.

== Satellite craters ==
By convention these features are identified on lunar maps by placing the letter on the side of the crater midpoint that is closest to Von Békésy.

Von Békésy	Latitude	Longitude	Diameter
F	52.9° N	137.3° E	18 km
T	52.2° N	121.9° E	29 km

== See also ==
- Georg von Békésy
