= Dixmier–Ng theorem =

In functional analysis, the Dixmier–Ng theorem is a characterization of when a normed space is in fact a dual Banach space. It was proven by Kung-fu Ng, who called it a variant of a theorem proven earlier by Jacques Dixmier.

Dixmier-Ng theorem. Let $X$ be a normed space. The following are equivalent:

1. There exists a Hausdorff locally convex topology $\tau$ on $X$ so that the closed unit ball, $\mathbf{B}_X$, of $X$ is $\tau$-compact.
2. There exists a Banach space $Y$ so that $X$ is isometrically isomorphic to the dual of $Y$.

That 2. implies 1. is an application of the Banach–Alaoglu theorem, setting $\tau$ to the Weak-* topology. That 1. implies 2. is an application of the Bipolar theorem.

== Applications ==
Let $M$ be a pointed metric space with distinguished point denoted $0_M$. The Dixmier-Ng Theorem is applied to show that the Lipschitz space $\text{Lip}_0(M)$ of all real-valued Lipschitz functions from $M$ to $\mathbb{R}$ that vanish at $0_M$ (endowed with the Lipschitz constant as norm) is a dual Banach space.
