= Volterra operator =

Bounded linear operator

In mathematics, in the area of functional analysis and operator theory, the Volterra operator, named after Vito Volterra, is a bounded linear operator on the space L^{2}[0,1] of complex-valued square-integrable functions on the interval [0,1]. On the subspace C[0,1] of continuous functions it represents indefinite integration. It is the operator corresponding to the Volterra integral equations.

== Definition ==
The Volterra operator, V, may be defined for a function f ∈ L^{2}[0,1] and a value t ∈ [0,1], as

$$V(f)(t) = \int_{0}^{t} f(s)\, ds.$$

== Properties ==
- V is a bounded linear operator between Hilbert spaces, with kernel form
  $$Vf(x) = \int_0^1 1_{y \leq x} f(y) dy$$
  proven by exchanging the integral sign.
- V is a Hilbert–Schmidt operator with norm $\|V\|_{HS}^2 = 1/2$, hence in particular is compact.
- Its Hermitian adjoint has kernel form
  $$V^*(f)(x) = \int_{x}^{1} f(y)dy = \int_0^1 1_{y \geq x} f(y)dy$$
- The positive-definite integral operator $K := V^* V$ has kernel form
  $$Kf(x) = \int_0^1 \min(1-x, 1-y) f(y) dy$$
  proven by exchanging the integral sign. Similarly, $VV^*$ has kernel $\min(x, y)$. They are unitarily equivalent via $Uf(x) = f(1-x)$, so both have the same spectrum.
- The eigenfunctions of $VV^*$ satisfy
  $$\begin{cases}
f(1) &= 0 \\
f'(0) &= 0 \\
f''(x) &= -\lambda^{-1} f
\end{cases}$$
  with solution
  $$f(x) = \sin((k+1/2) \pi x), \lambda = \left(\frac{1}{(k+ 1/2) \pi}\right)^2$$
  with $k = 0, 1, 2, \dots$.
- The singular values of V are $((k + 1/2) \pi)^{-1}$ with $k = 0, 1, 2, \dots$.
- The operator norm of V is $2/\pi$.
- V is not trace class.
- V has no eigenvalues and therefore, by the spectral theory of compact operators, its spectrum σ(V) = {0}.
- V is a quasinilpotent operator (that is, the spectral radius, ρ(V), is zero), but it is not nilpotent operator.

== See also ==
- Product integral
