= Cornelia Fabri =

Italian mathematician (1869–1915)

Cornelia Fabri (Ravenna, 9 September 1869 – Florence, 24 May 1915) was an Italian mathematician and the first woman to graduate in mathematics from University of Pisa (1891).

== Life and work ==
Cornelia Fabri was born in Ravenna, Italy, into a noble family headed by Ruggero Fabri and Lucrezia Satanassi de Sordi. Her immediate family was well-schooled in math and science. Her grandfather, Santi Fabri, had been a mathematics graduate from the University of Bologna and taught at the College of Ravenna. Her father Ruggero Fabri, focused on scientific studies and graduated from the University of Rome in Physical and Mathematical Sciences. As a child, Cornelia demonstrated such an "uncommon ability" for scientific subjects that, with her father's approval, she enrolled in the city's technical institute becoming the only female in a class of males. She earned top marks, easily passed the entrance exam and was allowed to enroll in the Faculty of Physical, Mathematical and Natural Sciences at the University of Pisa. Again, she was the only woman and attended her lessons accompanied by her mother. She graduated in 1891.

Her university teacher Vito Volterra, mathematical physicist and president of the Accademia dei Lincei, supervised her dissertation and followed Fabri's progress throughout her university years and remembered her as follows:

"I have a very vivid memory of Signorina Cornelia Fabri, my student at the University of Pisa around 1880, the first, and perhaps the best, among the many students I subsequently had in Turin and Rome. I remember that her degree exam was an event for the University of Pisa, not only because it was the first time a woman had come there to get her doctorate, but also because the test was supported admirably by the candidate, who achieved full marks, absolutes and praise. On that occasion the Illustrious Dean of the Faculty of Science, Professor Antonio Pacinotti, uttered lofty and timely words, noting all the importance of the event, and foreseeing the opening of a new era with the entry into the field of science, of eminent female personalities."

Fabri's scientific work focused primarily on hydraulics and was intense but brief. Her last academic work was published in 1895. In 1902, after the death of her mother, she left Pisa and returned to Ravenna to look after the family properties and her father. He died in 1904. She continued to keep in contact with Professor Volterra through detailed correspondence and the two mathematicians exchanged letters until 1902. They met for the last time in 1905.

In Ravenna, Fabri dedicated herself to charities and charitable activities.

Just three months before she died, Fabri used the language of science to describe to her confessor the reasons she was considering becoming a nun. "My heart has always been suspended between two equal and opposing forces, which balance each other and keep me in perfect blindness as to what my future will be."

Fabri died at age 46 in Florence from pneumonia on 24 May 1915.

== Selected works ==
- Above are some general properties of functions that depend on other functions and lines. Note by Cornelia Fabri, Turin, Claudio Clausen, 1890.
- Brief considerations regarding the new regulations for the lock on the Montone river, Ravenna, Calderini, 1892.
- On vortex motions in perfect fluids. Memoir of Cornelia Fabri, Bologna, Gamberini and Parmeggiani typography, 1892.
- On the theory of vortex motions in incompressible fluids, Pisa, Mistri & C, 1892.
- Electric signal bell installed by Mr. Abbé Ravaglia in the port of Ravenna, Paris, A. Durand and Pedone-Lauriel Editeurs, 1893.
- Above hyperspace functions. Note by Cornelia Fabri, Proceedings of the Royal Veneto Institute of Letters, Science and Arts, 1893.
- Vortex motions of order higher than the 1st in relation to the equations for the movement of viscous fluids, Bologna, Tipografia Gamberini and Parmeggiani, 1894.
- Higher order vortex motions in relation to the equations for the movement of compressible viscous fluids, Il Nuovo Cimento, 1895.
