= Krein's condition =

In mathematical analysis, Krein's condition provides a necessary and sufficient condition for exponential sums

$$\left\{ \sum_{k=1}^n a_k \exp(i \lambda_k x),
\quad  a_k \in \mathbb{C}, \, \lambda_k \geq 0 \right\},$$

to be dense in a weighted L_{2} space on the real line. It was discovered by Mark Krein in the 1940s. A corollary, also called Krein's condition, provides a sufficient condition for the indeterminacy of the moment problem.

== Statement ==
Let μ be an absolutely continuous measure on the real line, dμ(x) = f(x) dx. The exponential sums

$$\sum_{k=1}^n a_k \exp(i \lambda_k x),
\quad a_k \in \mathbb{C}, \, \lambda_k \geq 0$$

are dense in L_{2}(μ) if and only if

$$\int_{-\infty}^\infty \frac{- \ln f(x)}{1 + x^2} \, dx = \infty.$$

== Indeterminacy of the moment problem ==
Let μ be as above; assume that all the moments

$$m_n = \int_{-\infty}^\infty x^n d\mu(x), \quad n = 0,1,2,\ldots$$

of μ are finite. If

$$\int_{-\infty}^\infty \frac{- \ln f(x)}{1 + x^2} \, dx < \infty$$

holds, then the Hamburger moment problem for μ is indeterminate; that is, there exists another measure ν ≠ μ on R such that

$$m_n = \int_{-\infty}^\infty x^n \, d\nu(x), \quad n = 0,1,2,\ldots$$

This can be derived from the "only if" part of Krein's theorem above.

=== Example ===
Let

$$f(x) = \frac{1}{\sqrt{\pi}} \exp \left\{ - \ln^2 x \right\};$$

the measure dμ(x) = f(x) dx is called the Stieltjes–Wigert measure. Since

$$\int_{-\infty}^\infty \frac{- \ln f(x)}{1+x^2} dx
= \int_{-\infty}^\infty \frac{\ln^2 x + \ln \sqrt{\pi}}{1 + x^2} \, dx < \infty,$$

the Hamburger moment problem for μ is indeterminate.
