= Goldstine theorem =

In functional analysis, a branch of mathematics, the Goldstine theorem, named after Herman Goldstine, is stated as follows:

Goldstine theorem. Let $X$ be a Banach space, then the image of the closed unit ball $B \subseteq X$ under the canonical embedding into the closed unit ball $B^{\prime\prime}$ of the bidual space $X^{\prime\prime}$ is a weak*-dense subset.

The conclusion of the theorem is never true for the norm topology if $X$ is not reflexive; indeed, the image of $X$ in its bidual $X^{\prime\prime}$ is always norm closed, being the continuous image of a complete metric space under an isometry.

== Proof ==
=== Lemma ===
For all $x^{\prime\prime} \in B^{\prime\prime},$ $\varphi_1, \ldots, \varphi_n \in X^{\prime}$ and $\delta > 0,$ there exists an $x \in (1+\delta)B$ such that $\varphi_i(x) = x^{\prime\prime}(\varphi_i)$ for all $1 \leq i \leq n.$

==== Proof of lemma ====
By the surjectivity of
$$\begin{cases}
\Phi : X \to \Complex^{n}, \\ x \mapsto \left(\varphi_1(x), \cdots, \varphi_n(x) \right)
\end{cases}$$
it is possible to find $x \in X$ with $\varphi_i(x) = x^{\prime\prime}(\varphi_i)$ for $1 \leq i \leq n.$

Now let
$$Y := \bigcap_i \ker \varphi_i = \ker \Phi.$$

Every element of $z \in (x + Y) \cap (1 + \delta)B$ satisfies $z \in (1+\delta)B$ and $\varphi_i(z) = \varphi_i(x)= x^{\prime\prime}(\varphi_i),$ so it suffices to show that the intersection is nonempty.

Assume for contradiction that it is empty. Then $\operatorname{dist}(x, Y) \geq 1 + \delta$ and by the Hahn–Banach theorem there exists a linear form $\varphi \in X^{\prime}$ such that $\varphi\big\vert_Y = 0, \varphi(x) \geq 1 + \delta$ and $\|\varphi\|_{X^{\prime}} = 1.$ Then $\varphi \in \operatorname{span} \left\{ \varphi_1, \ldots, \varphi_n \right\}$ and therefore
$$1+\delta \leq \varphi(x) = x^{\prime\prime}(\varphi) \leq \|\varphi\|_{X^{\prime}} \left\|x^{\prime\prime}\right\|_{X^{\prime\prime}} \leq 1,$$
which is a contradiction.

=== Proof of theorem ===
Fix $x^{\prime\prime} \in B^{\prime\prime},$ $\varphi_1, \ldots, \varphi_n \in X^{\prime}$ and $\epsilon > 0.$ Examine the set
$$U := \left\{ y^{\prime\prime} \in X^{\prime\prime} : |(x^{\prime\prime} - y^{\prime\prime})(\varphi_i)| < \epsilon, 1 \leq i \leq n \right\}.$$

Let $J : X \rightarrow X^{\prime\prime}$ be the embedding defined by $J(x) = \text{Ev}_x,$ where $\text{Ev}_x(\varphi) = \varphi(x)$ is the evaluation at $x$ map. Sets of the form $U$ form a base for the weak* topology, so density follows once it is shown $J(B) \cap U \neq \varnothing$ for all such $U.$ The lemma above says that for any $\delta > 0$ there exists a $x \in (1+\delta)B$ such that $x^{\prime\prime}(\varphi_i)=\varphi_i(x),$ $1\leq i\leq n,$ and in particular $\text{Ev}_x \in U.$ Since $J(B) \subset B^{\prime\prime},$ we have $\text{Ev}_x \in (1+\delta)J(B) \cap U.$ We can scale to get $\frac{1}{1+\delta} \text{Ev}_x \in J(B).$ The goal is to show that for a sufficiently small $\delta > 0,$ we have $\frac{1}{1+\delta} \text{Ev}_x \in J(B) \cap U.$

Directly checking, one has
$$\left|\left[x^{\prime\prime} - \frac{1}{1+\delta} \text{Ev}_x\right](\varphi_i)\right| = \left|\varphi_i(x) - \frac{1}{1+\delta}\varphi_i(x)\right| = \frac{\delta}{1+\delta} |\varphi_i(x)|.$$

Note that one can choose $M$ sufficiently large so that $\|\varphi_i\|_{X^{\prime}} \leq M$ for $1 \leq i \leq n.$ Note as well that $\|x\|_{X} \leq (1+\delta).$ If one chooses $\delta$ so that $\delta M < \epsilon,$ then
$$\frac{\delta}{1+\delta} \left|\varphi_i(x)\right| \leq \frac{\delta}{1+\delta} \|\varphi_i\|_{X^{\prime}} \|x\|_{X} \leq  \delta \|\varphi_i\|_{X^{\prime}} \leq \delta M < \epsilon.$$

Hence one gets $\frac{1}{1+\delta} \text{Ev}_x \in J(B) \cap U$ as desired.

== See also ==
- Banach–Alaoglu theorem – Theorem in functional analysis
- Bishop–Phelps theorem
- Eberlein–Šmulian theorem – Relates three different kinds of weak compactness in a Banach space
- James' theorem – Theorem in mathematics
- Mazur's lemma – On strongly convergent combinations of a weakly convergent sequence in a Banach space
