= Bishop–Phelps theorem =

In mathematics, the Bishop–Phelps theorem is a theorem about the topological properties of Banach spaces named after Errett Bishop and Robert Phelps, who published its proof in 1961.

== Statement ==
Bishop–Phelps theorem—Let $B \subseteq X$ be a bounded, closed, convex subset of a real Banach space $X.$ Then the set of all continuous linear functionals $f$ that achieve their supremum on $B$ (meaning that there exists some $b_0 \in B$ such that $|f(b_0)| = \sup_{b \in B} |f(b)|$) $\left\{f \in X^* : f \text{ attains its supremum on } B\right\}$ is norm-dense in the continuous dual space $X^*$ of $X.$

Importantly, this theorem fails for complex Banach spaces. However, for the special case where $B$ is the closed unit ball then this theorem does hold for complex Banach spaces.

== See also ==
- Banach–Alaoglu theorem – Theorem in functional analysis
- Dual norm – Measurement on a normed vector space
- Eberlein–Šmulian theorem – Relates three different kinds of weak compactness in a Banach space
- James' theorem – theorem in mathematics
- Goldstine theorem
- Mazur's lemma – On strongly convergent combinations of a weakly convergent sequence in a Banach space
