= Carl Severin Wigert =

Swedish mathematician

Carl Severin Wigert (1871–1941) was a Swedish mathematician who created Stieltjes–Wigert polynomials and worked on the divisor function, including correctly describing its maximal order of growth. Wigert proved that

$$\limsup_{n\to\infty}\frac{\log d(n)}{\log n/\log\log n}=\log2.$$

== Selected publications ==
- "Sur quelques fonctions arithmétiques". Acta Mathematica. 37 (1): 113–140. 1914. doi:10.1007/bf02401831.
- "Sur la série de lambert et son application à la théorie des nombres". Acta Mathematica. 41 (1): 197–218. 1916. doi:10.1007/bf02422944.
