= James's theorem =

Theorem in mathematics

In mathematics, particularly functional analysis, James's theorem, named for Robert C. James, states that a Banach space $X$ is reflexive if and only if every continuous linear functional's norm on $X$ attains its supremum on the closed unit ball in $X.$

A stronger version of the theorem states that a weakly closed subset $C$ of a Banach space $X$ is weakly compact if and only if the dual norm each continuous linear functional on $X$ attains a maximum on $C.$

The hypothesis of completeness in the theorem cannot be dropped.

== Statements ==
The space $X$ considered can be a real or complex Banach space. Its continuous dual space is denoted by $X^{\prime}.$ The topological dual of $\mathbb{R}$-Banach space deduced from $X$ by any restriction scalar will be denoted $X^{\prime}_{\R}.$ (It is of interest only if $X$ is a complex space because if $X$ is a $\R$-space then $X^{\prime}_{\R} = X^{\prime}.$)

James compactness criterion—Let $X$ be a Banach space and $A$ a weakly closed nonempty subset of $X.$ The following conditions are equivalent:

- $A$ is weakly compact.
- For every $f \in X^{\prime},$ there exists an element $a_0 \in A$ such that $\left|f\left(a_0\right)\right| = \sup_{a \in A} |f(a)|.$
- For any $f \in X^{\prime}_{\R},$ there exists an element $a_0 \in A$ such that $f\left(a_0\right) = \sup_{a \in A} |f(a)|.$
- For any $f \in X^{\prime}_{\R},$ there exists an element $a_0 \in A$ such that $f\left(a_0\right) = \sup_{a \in A} f(a).$

A Banach space being reflexive if and only if its closed unit ball is weakly compact one deduces from this, since the norm of a continuous linear form is the upper bound of its modulus on this ball:

James's theorem—A Banach space $X$ is reflexive if and only if for all $f \in X^{\prime},$ there exists an element $a \in X$ of norm $\|a\| \leq 1$ such that $f(a) = \|f\|.$

== History ==
Historically, these sentences were proved in reverse order. In 1957, James had proved the reflexivity criterion for separable Banach spaces and 1964 for general Banach spaces. Since the reflexivity is equivalent to the weak compactness of the unit sphere, Victor L. Klee reformulated this as a compactness criterion for the unit sphere in 1962 and assumes that this criterion characterizes any weakly compact quantities. This was then actually proved by James in 1964.

== See also ==
- Banach–Alaoglu theorem – Theorem in functional analysis
- Bishop–Phelps theorem
- Dual norm – Measurement on a normed vector space
- Eberlein–Šmulian theorem – Relates three different kinds of weak compactness in a Banach space
- Goldstine theorem
- Mazur's lemma – On strongly convergent combinations of a weakly convergent sequence in a Banach space
- Operator norm – Measure of the "size" of linear operators
