= Dual norm =

Measurement on a normed vector space

In functional analysis, the dual norm is a measure of size for a continuous linear function defined on a normed vector space.

== Definition ==
Let $X$ be a normed vector space with norm $\|\cdot\|$ and let $X^*$ denote its continuous dual space. The dual norm of a continuous linear functional $f$ belonging to $X^*$ is the non-negative real number defined by any of the following equivalent formulas:
$$\begin{alignat}{5}
\| f \| &= \sup &&\{\,|f(x)| &&~:~ \|x\| \leq 1 ~&&~\text{ and } ~&&x \in X\} \\
&= \sup &&\{\,|f(x)| &&~:~ \|x\| < 1 ~&&~\text{ and } ~&&x \in X\} \\
&= \inf &&\{\,c \in [0, \infty) &&~:~ |f(x)| \leq c \|x\| ~&&~\text{ for all } ~&&x \in X\} \\
&= \sup &&\{\,|f(x)| &&~:~ \|x\| = 1 \text{ or } 0 ~&&~\text{ and } ~&&x \in X\} \\
&= \sup &&\{\,|f(x)| &&~:~ \|x\| = 1 ~&&~\text{ and } ~&&x \in X\} \;\;\;\text{ this equality holds if and only if } X \neq \{0\} \\
&= \sup &&\bigg\{\,\frac{|f(x)|}{\|x\|} ~&&~:~ x \neq 0 &&~\text{ and } ~&&x \in X\bigg\} \;\;\;\text{ this equality holds if and only if } X \neq \{0\} \\
\end{alignat}$$
where $\sup$ and $\inf$ denote the supremum and infimum, respectively. The constant $0$ map is the origin of the vector space $X^*$ and it always has norm $\|0\| = 0.$ If $X = \{0\}$ then the only linear functional on $X$ is the constant $0$ map and moreover, the sets in the last two rows will both be empty and consequently, their supremums will equal $\sup \varnothing = - \infty$ instead of the correct value of $0.$

Importantly, a linear function $f$ is not, in general, guaranteed to achieve its norm $\|f\| = \sup \{|f (x)| : \|x\| \leq 1, x \in X\}$ on the closed unit ball $\{x \in X : \|x\| \leq 1\},$ meaning that there might not exist any vector $u \in X$ of norm $\|u\| \leq 1$ such that $\|f\| = |f u|$ (if such a vector does exist and if $f \neq 0,$ then $u$ would necessarily have unit norm $\|u\| = 1$). R.C. James proved James's theorem in 1964, which states that a Banach space $X$ is reflexive if and only if every bounded linear function $f \in X^*$ achieves its norm on the closed unit ball. It follows, in particular, that every non-reflexive Banach space has some bounded linear functional that does not achieve its norm on the closed unit ball. However, the Bishop–Phelps theorem guarantees that the set of bounded linear functionals that achieve their norm on the unit sphere of a Banach space is a norm-dense subset of the continuous dual space.

The map $f \mapsto \|f\|$ defines a norm on $X^*.$ (See Theorems 1 and 2 below.) The dual norm is a special case of the operator norm defined for each (bounded) linear map between normed vector spaces. Since the ground field of $X$ ($\Reals$ or $\Complex$) is complete, $X^*$ is a Banach space. The topology on $X^*$ induced by $\|\cdot\|$ turns out to be stronger than the weak-* topology on $X^*.$

== The double dual of a normed linear space ==
The double dual (or second dual) $X^{**}$ of $X$ is the dual of the normed vector space $X^*$. There is a natural map $\varphi: X \to X^{**}$. Indeed, for each $w^*$ in $X^*$ define $\varphi(v)(w^*): = w^*(v).$

The map $\varphi$ is linear, injective, and distance preserving. In particular, if $X$ is complete (i.e. a Banach space), then $\varphi$ is an isometry onto a closed subspace of $X^{**}$.

In general, the map $\varphi$ is not surjective. For example, if $X$ is the Banach space $L^{\infty}$ consisting of bounded functions on the real line with the supremum norm, then the map $\varphi$ is not surjective. (See $L^p$ space). If $\varphi$ is surjective, then $X$ is said to be a reflexive Banach space. If $1 < p < \infty,$ then the space $L^p$ is a reflexive Banach space.

== Examples ==
=== Dual norm for matrices ===
The Frobenius norm defined by $\| A\|_{\text{F}} = \sqrt{\sum_{i=1}^m\sum_{j=1}^n \left| a_{ij} \right|^2} = \sqrt{\operatorname{trace}(A^*A)} = \sqrt{\sum_{i=1}^{\min\{m,n\}} \sigma_{i}^2}$ is self-dual, i.e., its dual norm is $\| \cdot \|'_{\text{F}} = \| \cdot \|_{\text{F}}.$

The spectral norm, a special case of the induced norm when $p=2$, is defined by the maximum singular values of a matrix, that is, $\| A \| _2 = \sigma_{\max}(A),$ has the nuclear norm as its dual norm, which is defined by $\|B\|'_2 = \sum_i \sigma_i(B),$ for any matrix $B$ where $\sigma_i(B)$ denote the singular values.

If $p, q \in [1, \infty]$ the Schatten $\ell^p$-norm on matrices is dual to the Schatten $\ell^q$-norm.

=== Finite-dimensional spaces ===
Let $\|\cdot\|$ be a norm on $\R^n.$ The associated dual norm, denoted $\| \cdot \|_*,$ is defined as $\|z\|_* = \sup\{z^\intercal x : \|x\| \leq 1 \}.$

(This can be shown to be a norm.) The dual norm can be interpreted as the operator norm of $z^\intercal,$ interpreted as a $1 \times n$ matrix, with the norm $\|\cdot\|$ on $\R^n$, and the absolute value on $\R$: $\|z\|_* = \sup\{|z^\intercal x| : \|x\| \leq 1 \}.$

From the definition of dual norm we have the inequality $z^\intercal x = \|x\| \left(z^\intercal \frac{x}{\|x\|} \right) \leq \|x\| \|z\|_*$ which holds for all $x$ and $z.$ The dual of the dual norm is the original norm: we have $\|x\|_{**} = \|x\|$ for all $x.$ (This need not hold in infinite-dimensional vector spaces.)

The dual of the Euclidean norm is the Euclidean norm, since $\sup\{z^\intercal x : \|x\|_2 \leq 1 \} = \|z\|_2.$

(This follows from the Cauchy–Schwarz inequality; for nonzero $z,$ the value of $x$ that maximises $z^\intercal x$ over $\|x\|_2 \leq 1$ is $\tfrac{z}{\|z\|_2}.$)

The dual of the $\ell^\infty$-norm is the $\ell^1$-norm: $\sup\{z^\intercal x : \|x\| _\infty \leq 1\} = \sum_{i=1}^n |z_i| = \|z\| _1,$ and the dual of the $\ell^1$-norm is the $\ell^\infty$-norm.

More generally, Hölder's inequality shows that the dual of the $\ell^p$-norm is the $\ell^q$-norm, where $q$ satisfies $\tfrac{1}{p} + \tfrac{1}{q} = 1,$ that is, $q = \tfrac{p}{p-1}.$

As another example, consider the $\ell^2$- or spectral norm on $\R^{m\times n}$. The associated dual norm is $\|Z\| _{2*} = \sup\{\mathbf{tr}(Z^\intercal X) : \|X\|_2 \leq 1\},$ which turns out to be the sum of the singular values, $\|Z\| _{2*} = \sigma_1(Z) + \cdots + \sigma_r(Z) = \mathbf{tr} (\sqrt{Z^\intercal Z}),$ where $r = \mathbf{rank} Z.$ This norm is sometimes called the nuclear norm.

=== L^{p} and ℓ^{p} spaces ===
For $p \in [1, \infty],$ p-norm (also called $\ell_p$-norm) of vector $\mathbf{x} = (x_n)_n$ is $\|\mathbf{x}\|_p ~:=~ \left(\sum_{i=1}^n \left|x_i\right|^p\right)^{1/p}.$

If $p, q \in [1, \infty]$ satisfy $1/p+1/q=1$ then the $\ell^p$ and $\ell^q$ norms are dual to each other and the same is true of the $L^p$ and $L^q$ norms, where $(X, \Sigma, \mu),$ is some measure space. In particular the Euclidean norm is self-dual since $p = q = 2.$ For $\sqrt{x^{\mathrm{T}}Qx}$, the dual norm is $\sqrt{y^{\mathrm{T}}Q^{-1}y}$ with $Q$ positive definite.

For $p = 2,$ the $\|\,\cdot\,\|_2$-norm is even induced by a canonical inner product $\langle \,\cdot,\,\cdot\rangle,$ meaning that $\|\mathbf{x}\|_2 = \sqrt{\langle \mathbf{x}, \mathbf{x} \rangle}$ for all vectors $\mathbf{x}.$ This inner product can expressed in terms of the norm by using the polarization identity. On $\ell^2,$ this is the Euclidean inner product defined by $\langle \left(x_n\right)_{n}, \left(y_n\right)_{n} \rangle_{\ell^2} ~=~ \sum_n x_n \overline{y_n}$ while for the space $L^2(X, \mu)$ associated with a measure space $(X, \Sigma, \mu),$ which consists of all square-integrable functions, this inner product is $\langle f, g \rangle_{L^2} = \int_X f(x) \overline{g(x)} \, \mathrm dx.$ The norms of the continuous dual spaces of $\ell^2$ and $\ell^2$ satisfy the polarization identity, and so these dual norms can be used to define inner products. With this inner product, this dual space is also a Hilbert space.

== Properties ==
Given normed vector spaces $X$ and $Y,$ let $L(X,Y)$ be the collection of all bounded linear mappings (or operators) of $X$ into $Y.$ Then $L(X,Y)$ can be given a canonical norm.

Theorem 1—Let $X$ and $Y$ be normed spaces. Assigning to each continuous linear operator $f \in L(X, Y)$ the scalar $\|f\| = \sup \{\|f(x)\| : x \in X, \|x\| \leq 1\}$ defines a norm $\|\cdot\| ~:~ L(X, Y) \to \Reals$ on $L(X, Y)$ that makes $L(X, Y)$ into a normed space. Moreover, if $Y$ is a Banach space then so is $L(X, Y).$

Proof

A subset of a normed space is bounded if and only if it lies in some multiple of the unit sphere; thus $\|f\| < \infty$ for every $f \in L(X,Y)$ if $\alpha$ is a scalar, then $(\alpha f)(x) = \alpha \cdot f x$ so that $\|\alpha f\| = |\alpha| \|f\|.$

The triangle inequality in $Y$ shows that
$$\begin{align}
\| \left(f_1 + f_2\right) x \| ~&=~ \|f_1 x + f_2 x\| \\
&\leq~ \|f_1 x\| + \|f_2 x\| \\
&\leq~ \left(\|f_1\| + \|f_2\|\right) \|x\| \\
&\leq~ \|f_1\| + \|f_2\|
\end{align}$$

for every $x \in X$ satisfying $\|x\| \leq 1.$ This fact together with the definition of $\| \cdot \| ~:~ L(X, Y) \to \mathbb{R}$ implies the triangle inequality: $\|f + g\| \leq \|f\| + \|g\|.$

Since $\{ |f(x)| : x \in X, \|x\| \leq 1 \}$ is a non-empty set of non-negative real numbers, $\|f\| = \sup \left\{ |f(x)| : x \in X, \| x \| \leq 1 \right\}$ is a non-negative real number. If $f \neq 0$ then $f x_0 \neq 0$ for some $x_0 \in X,$ which implies that $\left\|f x_0\right\| > 0$ and consequently $\|f\| > 0.$ This shows that $\left( L(X, Y), \| \cdot \|\right)$ is a normed space.

Assume now that $Y$ is complete and we will show that $( L(X, Y), \| \cdot \|)$ is complete. Let $f_{\bull} = \left(f_n\right)_{n=1}^{\infty}$ be a Cauchy sequence in $L(X, Y),$ so by definition $\left\|f_n - f_m\right\| \to 0$ as $n, m \to \infty.$ This fact together with the relation $\left\|f_n x - f_m x\right\| = \left\| \left( f_n - f_m \right) x \right\| \leq \left\|f_n - f_m\right\| \|x\|$

implies that $\left(f_nx \right)_{n=1}^{\infty}$ is a Cauchy sequence in $Y$ for every $x \in X.$ It follows that for every $x \in X,$ the limit $\lim_{n \to \infty} f_n x$ exists in $Y$ and so we will denote this (necessarily unique) limit by $f x,$ that is: $f x ~=~ \lim_{n \to \infty} f_n x.$

It can be shown that $f: X \to Y$ is linear. If $\varepsilon > 0$, then $\left\|f_n - f_m\right\| \| x \| ~\leq~ \varepsilon \|x\|$ for all sufficiently large integers n and m. It follows that $\left\|fx - f_m x\right\| ~\leq~ \varepsilon \|x\|$ for sufficiently all large $m.$ Hence $\|fx\| \leq \left( \left\|f_m\right\| + \varepsilon \right) \|x\|,$ so that $f \in L(X, Y)$ and $\left\|f - f_m\right\| \leq \varepsilon.$ This shows that $f_m \to f$ in the norm topology of $L(X, Y).$ This establishes the completeness of $L(X, Y).$

When $Y$ is a scalar field (i.e. $Y = \Complex$ or $Y = \R$) so that $L(X,Y)$ is the dual space $X^*$ of $X.$

Theorem 2—Let $X$ be a normed space and for every $x^* \in X^*$ let $\left\|x^*\right\| ~:=~ \sup \left\{| \langle x, x^* \rangle | ~:~ x \in X \text{ with } \| x \| \leq 1 \right\}$ where by definition $\langle x, x^* \rangle ~:=~ x^{*}(x)$ is a scalar. Then

1. $\| \, \cdot \, \| : X^* \to \R$ is a norm that makes $X^*$ a Banach space.
2. If $B^*$ is the closed unit ball of $X^*$ then for every $x \in X,$
  $$\begin{alignat}{4}
\| x \| ~&=~ \sup \left\{ | \langle x, x^* \rangle | ~:~ x^* \in B^* \right\} \\
&=~ \sup \left\{ \left|x^*(x)\right| ~:~ \left\|x^*\right\| \leq 1 \text{ with } x^* \in X^* \right\}. \\
\end{alignat}$$
  Consequently, $x^* \mapsto \langle x, x^* \rangle$ is a bounded linear functional on $X^*$ with norm $\| x^* \| ~=~ \| x \|.$
3. $B^*$ is weak*-compact.

Proof

Let $B ~=~ \sup\{ x \in X ~:~ \| x \| \le 1 \}$denote the closed unit ball of a normed space $X.$ When $Y$ is the scalar field then $L(X,Y) = X^*$ so part (a) is a corollary of Theorem 1. Fix $x \in X.$ There exists $y^* \in B^*$ such that $\langle{x,y^*}\rangle = \|x\|.$ but, $|\langle{x,x^*}\rangle| \leq \|x\|\|x^*\| \leq \|x\|$ for every $x^* \in B^*$. (b) follows from the above. Since the open unit ball $U$ of $X$ is dense in $B$, the definition of $\|x^*\|$ shows that $x^* \in B^*$ if and only if $|\langle{x,x^*}\rangle| \leq 1$ for every $x \in U$. The proof for (c) now follows directly.

As usual, let $d(x, y) := \|x - y\|$ denote the canonical metric induced by the norm on $X,$ and denote the distance from a point $x$ to the subset $S \subseteq X$ by $d(x, S) ~:=~ \inf_{s \in S} d(x, s) ~=~ \inf_{s \in S} \|x - s\|.$ If $f$ is a bounded linear functional on a normed space $X,$ then for every vector $x \in X,$ $|f(x)| = \|f\| \, d(x, \ker f),$ where $\ker f = \{k \in X : f(k) = 0\}$ denotes the kernel of $f.$

== See also ==
- Convex conjugate – Generalization of the Legendre transformation
- Hölder's inequality – Inequality between integrals in Lp spaces
- Lp space – Function spaces generalizing finite-dimensional p norm spaces
- Operator norm – Measure of the "size" of linear operators
- Polarization identity – Formula relating the norm and the inner product in a inner product space
