= Aaron Ḥai Volterra =

Jewish Italian poet and rabbi

- אהרן חי וולטרה
- Born: fl. 18th century Italy
- Occupation: Poet • rabbi

Aaron Ḥai Volterra (Hebrew: אהרן חי וולטרה, romanized: ahran chi voltera; fl. 18th century) was an Italian liturgical poet and rabbi, who served as spiritual leader of the Jewish communities of Massa-Carrara.

Volterra was the author of a prayer entitled Baḳḳashah ('Request'), or Elef Shin ('One Thousand Shins'). The latter name, however, is misleading; for in the entire prayer, in which each word begins with the letter shin, this letter occurs only 700 times, and not, as this title would indicate, 1,000 times. In his preface, the author states that numerous difficulties obliged him to resort to artificial word-formations, in which he felt that the license of poetry justified him. The poem, which begins with the words "Shaddai shokhen sheḥaḳim soneh shekarim" (Shaddai who dwells above the skies despises lies'), is accompanied by a commentary containing a glossary of the Talmudic terms occurring in it. A second poem by Volterra, forming an eightfold acrostic of the author's name, commences "'Alekhem ishim eḳra" ('Unto you, men, do I call'), and is written after the style of the poems of Jedaiah ben Abraham Bedersi. These two works were published together under the title Baḳḳashah Ḥadashah ('A New Request'; Leghorn, 1740).
