= Volterra space =

Property of topological spaces

In mathematics, in the field of topology, a topological space is said to be a Volterra space if any finite intersection of dense G_{δ} subsets is dense. Every Baire space is Volterra, but the converse is not true. In fact, any metrizable Volterra space is Baire.

The name refers to a paper of Vito Volterra in which he uses the fact that (in modern notation) the intersection of two dense G-delta sets in the real numbers is again dense.
