= David Milman =

Ukrainian-born Israeli mathematician (1912–1982)

David Pinhusovich Milman
- Дави́д Пи́нхусович Ми́льман
- Born: January 15, 1912; Chechelnyk, Ukraine
- Died: July 12, 1982 (aged 70); Tel Aviv, Israel
- Education: Odessa State University
- Known for: Krein–Milman theorem, Milman–Pettis theorem
- Children: Vitali Milman, Pierre Milman
- Scientific career
- Fields: Functional analysis
- Workplaces: Tel Aviv University
- Doctoral advisor: Mark Krein

David Pinhusovich Milman (Russian: Дави́д Пи́нхусович Ми́льман; 15 January 1912 in Chechelnyk near Vinnytsia – 12 July 1982 in Tel Aviv) was a Soviet and later Israeli mathematician specializing in functional analysis. He was one of the major figures of the Soviet school of functional analysis. In the 70s he emigrated to Israel and was on the faculty of Tel Aviv University.

Milman is known for his development of functional analysis methods, particularly in operator theory, in close connection with concrete problems coming from mathematical physics, in particular differential equations and normal modes. The Krein–Milman theorem and the Milman–Pettis theorem are named after him.

Milman received his Ph.D. from Odessa State University in 1939 under direction of Mark Krein.

He is the father of the mathematicians Vitali Milman and Pierre Milman; and the grandfather to the mathematician Emanuel Milman and biochemist Pavel Milman.
