= Bohuslav Hostinský =

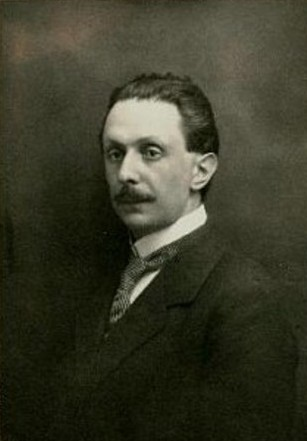
- Hostinský in 1925
- Born: 5 December 1884; Prague, Bohemia, Austria-Hungary
- Died: 12 April 1951 (aged 66); Brno, Czechoslovakia
- Education: Charles University
- Scientific career
- Workplaces: Masaryk University

Bohuslav Hostinský (5 December 1884 – 12 April 1951) was a Czech mathematician and theoretical physicist.

== Early life and family ==
Hostinský was born on 5 December 1884 in the New Town quarter of Prague in Bohemia, Austria-Hungary. His father Otakar Hostinský was a musicologist and professor of aesthetics at Charles University. Bohuslav Hostinský was the eldest of four siblings.

He married Emilie Veselíková (1883–?) in Královské Vinohrady on 19 July 1910. According to the police archive, they lived in Královské Vinohrady. They had two children, the daughter Věra and the son Zdeněk, a chess player and professor of Brno University of Technology.

== Studies ==
After graduating from secondary school, Bohuslav Hostinský studied mathematics and physics at the Faculty of Arts of Prague's Charles University. There in 1907 he received his doctorate with a dissertation on Lie spherical geometry and in the same year he became an adjunct professor at the gymnasium in Nový Bydžov, from where in April 1908 he transferred to the gymnasium in Roudnice nad Labem and eventually to Prague's Gymnasium in Kodaňská street. For the academic year 1908–09 he studied at the University of Paris in Paris; his time there profoundly influenced his research.

== Career ==
In November 1911 he passed the formal examination for the acceptance of his habilitation thesis at Charles University; the examination committee included Karel Petr, Jan Sobotka, and Vincenc Strouhal.

On 9 August 1920, Hostinský was appointed a full professor of theoretical physics at the Faculty of Science in Brno's Masaryk University, as well as director of the department. He worked there until his death.

Bohuslav Hostinský focused, at the beginning of his career, on differential geometry and then focused on mathematical physics. His research deals with the kinetic theory of gases, probability theory, statistical mechanics, and oscillation theory. He studied the works of the Russian mathematician A. A. Markov and drew attention to them. Hostinský's work on transition probabilities and Markov chains was then further developed by many foreign experts. Laurent Mazliak gave an analysis of the letters exchanged between Hostinský and Wolfgang Doeblin.

In a note submitted to the Paris Academy of Sciences in 1928, Hostinský introduced an elementary version of the ergodic theorem for a Markov chain with continuous state [Hostinský 1928]. Hostinský's work on this topic came before the spectacular development of the 1930s at the hands of Andrei N. Kolmogorov and others. Upon reading Hostinský's article, Jacques Hadamard plunged into probability for the first and only time of his life, a period referred to as his "ergodic spring" which ended at the Bologna ICM in September 1928 where Hadamard gave a talk on the ergodic principle [Bru 2003, pp. 158–159]. Between February and June 1928, Hostinský and Hadamard exchanged many letters, published several notes responding to one another, and also met during Hadamardřs journey to Czechoslovakia in May. From this moment, Hostinský acquired real international prestige, and in the 1930s, his little school in Brno became an active research center on Markovian phenomena.

Bohuslav Hostinský was four times an invited speaker at the International Congress of Mathematicians — in Cambridge, England in 1912, in Strasbourg in 1920, in Bologna in 1928, and in Zurich in 1932. He published about 140 papers and several monographs.

From the establishment of the Faculty of Science in Masaryk University until 1948 (with an interruption from 1934 to 1939), he was the editor of the Spisů (research journal) published by this faculty. He was several times dean of the Faculty of Science and from 1929 to 1930 rector. He was a member of many scientific societies and in 1933 he was elected a member extraordinarius of the Czechoslovak Academy of Sciences. He actively participated in the activities of the Brno chapter of the Union of Czech mathematicians and physicists; in the difficult years from 1942 to 1945 he was the chair of the Brno chapter.

== Selected publications ==
=== Articles ===
- Hostinský, B. (1909). "Sur un théorème analogue au théorème de Meusnier" (PDF). Nouvelles annales de mathématiques: Journal des candidats aux écoles polytechnique et normale. 4^{e} série. 9: 399–403.
- Hostinský, B. (1909). "Sur quelques figures déterminées par les éléments infiniment voisins d'une courbe gauche" (PDF). Journal de mathématiques pures et appliquées. 6^{e} série. 5: 263–326.
- Hostinský, Bohuslav (1920). "Sur une nouvelle solution du problème de l'aiguille". Bulletin des sciences mathématiques. 44: 126–136.
- Hostinský, B. (1926). "Sur la méthode des fonctions arbitraires dans le Calcul des probabilités". Acta Mathematica. 49 (1–2): 95–113. doi:10.1007/BF02543850.
- Hostinský, Bohuslav (1928). "Sur les probabilités relatives aux transformations répétées". Comptes rendus hebdomadaires des séances de l'Académie des Sciences. 186: 59–61.
- Hostinský, Bohuslav (1932). "Application du Calcul des Probabilités à la Théorie du mouvement Brownien" (PDF). Annales de l'Institut Henri Poincaré. 3 (1): 1–74.
- Hostinský, B. (1934). "Résolution d'une équation fonctionnelle considérée par M. Hadamard" (PDF). Bulletin de la Société Mathématique de France. 62: 151–166. doi:10.24033/bsmf.1218.
- Hostinský, Bohuslav (1935). "Sur les progrès récents de la théorie des probabilités". Časopis pro pěstování matematiky a fysiky. 64 (5): 94–106. doi:10.21136/CPMF.1935.121253.
- Hostinský, Bohuslav (1935). "Principe d'Huyghens" (PDF). Časopis pro pěstování matematiky a fysiky. 64 (6): 230–231. doi:10.21136/CPMF.1935.123580.
- Hostinský, Bohuslav (1935). "Sur les quatre sommets d'un ovale" (PDF). Časopis pro pěstování matematiky a fysiky. 64 (6): 193. doi:10.21136/CPMF.1935.123587.
- Hostinský, Bohuslav (1937). "Sur les probabilités relatives aux variables aléatoires liées entre elles Applications diverses" (PDF). Annales de l'Institut Henri Poincaré. 7 (2): 69–119.

=== Monographs and books ===
- Hostinský, Bohuslav (1915). Diferenciální geometrie křivek a ploch. Knihovna spisů matematických a fysikálních. V Praze : Nákladem Jednoty českých mathematiků a fysiků. (Differential geometry of curves and surfaces)
- Hostinský, B. (1924). Mechanika tuhých těles. Knihovna spisů matematických a fyzikálních, JČMF. (Mechanics of rigid bodies)
- Hostinský, Bohuslav (1926). Sur les probabilités géométriques. Publications de la Faculté des Sciences de l’Université Masaryk; 26 pages
- with Vito Volterra: Opérations infinitésimales linéaires. Paris: Gauthier-Villars. 1938.
