= Nilpotent operator =

In operator theory, a bounded operator T on a Banach space is said to be nilpotent if T^{n} = 0 for some positive integer n. It is said to be quasinilpotent or topologically nilpotent if its spectrum σ(T) = {0}.

== Examples ==
In the finite-dimensional case, i.e. when T is a square matrix (Nilpotent matrix) with complex entries, σ(T) = {0} if and only if T is similar to a matrix whose only nonzero entries are on the superdiagonal(this fact is used to prove the existence of Jordan canonical form). In turn this is equivalent to T^{n} = 0 for some n. Therefore, for matrices, quasinilpotency coincides with nilpotency.

This is not true when H is infinite-dimensional. Consider the Volterra operator, defined as follows: consider the unit square X = [0,1] × [0,1] ⊂ R^{2}, with the Lebesgue measure m. On X, define the kernel function K by

$$K(x,y) =
\left\{
\begin{matrix}
1, & \mbox{if} \; x \geq y\\
0, & \mbox{otherwise}.
\end{matrix}
\right.$$

The Volterra operator is the corresponding integral operator T on the Hilbert space L^{2}(0,1) given by

$$T f(x) = \int_0 ^1 K(x,y) f(y) dy.$$

The operator T is not nilpotent: take f to be the function that is 1 everywhere and direct calculation shows that T^{n} f ≠ 0 (in the sense of L^{2}) for all n. However, T is quasinilpotent. First notice that K is in L^{2}(X, m), therefore T is compact. By the spectral properties of compact operators, any nonzero λ in σ(T) is an eigenvalue. But it can be shown that T has no nonzero eigenvalues, therefore T is quasinilpotent.
