= Vitold Shmulyan =

Soviet mathematician

Vitold Lvovich Shmulyan (Russian: Витольд Львович Шмульян; 29 August 1914 – 27 August 1944) was a Soviet mathematician known for his work in functional analysis. The Eberlein–Šmulian theorem and Krein–Smulian theorem are named after him.
