= Vito Volterra =

Italian mathematician and physicist (1860–1940)

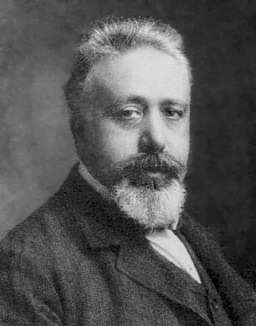
- Born: 3 May 1860; Ancona, Papal States
- Died: 11 October 1940 (aged 80); Rome, Kingdom of Italy
- Education: University of Pisa; Scuola Normale Superiore di Pisa
- Known for: Volterra integral equation Volterra operator Lotka–Volterra equations Volterra lattice
- Awards: ForMemRS
- Scientific career
- Fields: Mathematics
- Workplaces: University of Pisa; University of Turin; Sapienza University of Rome
- Doctoral advisor: Enrico Betti
- Doctoral students: Paul Lévy; Joseph Pérès; Cornelia Fabri

President of the Accademia nazionale delle scienze
- In office 29 October 1918 – 10 November 1920
- Preceded by: Ulisse Dini
- Succeeded by: Emanuele Paternò

Vito Volterra KBE FRS(For) HFRSE (/voʊlˈtɛrə/, Italian: [ˈviːto volˈtɛrra]; 3 May 1860 – 11 October 1940) was an Italian mathematician and physicist, known for his contributions to mathematical biology and integral equations, being one of the founders of functional analysis.

== Biography ==
Born in Ancona, then part of the Papal States, into a very poor Jewish family: his father was Abramo Volterra and his mother, Angelica Almagià. Abramo Volterra died in 1862 when Vito was two years old. The family moved to Turin, and then to Florence, where he studied at the Dante Alighieri Technical School and the Galileo Galilei Technical Institute.

Volterra showed early promise in mathematics before attending the University of Pisa, where he fell under the influence of Enrico Betti, and where he became professor of rational mechanics in 1883. He immediately started work developing his theory of functionals which led to his interest and later contributions in integral and integro-differential equations. His work is summarised in his book Theory of functionals and of Integral and Integro-Differential Equations (1930).

In 1892, he became professor of mechanics at the University of Turin and then, in 1900, professor of mathematical physics at the University of Rome La Sapienza. Volterra had grown up during the final stages of the Risorgimento when the Papal States were finally annexed by Italy and, like his mentor Betti, he was an enthusiastic patriot, being named by the king Victor Emmanuel III as a senator of the Kingdom of Italy in 1905. In the same year, he began to develop the theory of dislocations in crystals that was later to become important in the understanding of the behaviour of ductile materials. On the outbreak of World War I, already well into his 50s, he joined the Italian Army and worked on the development of airships under Giulio Douhet. He originated the idea of using inert helium rather than flammable hydrogen and made use of his leadership abilities in organising its manufacture.

After World War I, Volterra turned his attention to the application of his mathematical ideas to biology, principally reiterating and developing the work of Pierre François Verhulst. An outcome of this period is the Lotka–Volterra equations.

Volterra is the only person who was a plenary speaker in the International Congress of Mathematicians four times (1900, 1908, 1920, 1928).

Volterra was an International Member of the United States National Academy of Sciences and the American Philosophical Society.

In 1922, he joined the opposition to the Fascist regime of Benito Mussolini and in 1931 he was one of only 12 out of 1,250 professors who refused to take a mandatory oath of loyalty. His political philosophy can be seen in a postcard he sent in the 1930s, on which he wrote what can be seen as an epitaph for Mussolini's Italy: Empires die, but Euclid's theorems keep their youth forever. However, Volterra was no radical firebrand; he might have been equally appalled if the leftist opposition to Mussolini had come to power since he was a lifelong royalist and nationalist. As a result of his refusal to sign the oath of allegiance to the fascist government he was compelled to resign his university post and his membership of scientific academies, and, during the following years, he lived largely abroad, returning to Rome just before his death.

In 1936, he was appointed a member of the Pontifical Academy of Sciences, on the initiative of founder Agostino Gemelli.

He died in Rome on 11 October 1940. He is buried in the Ariccia Cemetery. The Pontifical Academy organised his funeral and its President Carlo Somigliana edited a long obituary in the Osservatore romano on 12 October 1940.

== Family ==
In 1900 he married Virginia Almagia, a cousin. Their son Edoardo Volterra (1904–1984) was a famous historian of Roman law.

Volterra also had a daughter, Luisa Volterra, who married the biologist Umberto D'Ancona. D'Ancona piqued his father-in-law's interest in biomathematics when he showed Vito a set of data regarding populations of different species of fish in the Adriatic Sea, where decreased fishing activity from the war had led to an increase in the populations of predatory fish species. Vito published an analysis of the dynamics of interacting species of fish the next year.

== Selected writings by Volterra ==
- 1912. The theory of permutable functions. Princeton University Press.
- 1913. Leçons sur les fonctions de lignes. Paris: Gauthier-Villars.
- 1912. Sur quelques progrès récents de la physique mathématique. Clark University.
- 1913. Leçons sur les équations intégrales et les équations intégro-différentielles. Paris: Gauthier-Villars.
- 1926, "Variazioni e fluttuazioni del numero d'individui in specie animali conviventi," Mem. R. Accad. Naz. dei Lincei 2: 31–113.
- 1926, "Fluctuations in the abundance of a species considered mathematically," Nature 118: 558–60.
- 1930. Theory of functionals and of integral and integro-differential equations. Blackie & Son.
- 1931. Leçons sur la théorie mathématique de la lutte pour la vie. Paris: Gauthier-Villars. Reissued 1990, Gabay, J., ed.
- 1936. with Joseph Pérès: Théorie générale des fonctionnelles. Paris: Gauthier-Villars.
- 1938. with Bohuslav Hostinský: Opérations infinitésimales linéaires. Paris: Gauthier-Villars.
- 1960. Sur les Distorsions des corps élastiques (with Enrico Volterra). Paris: Gauthier-Villars.
- 1954-1962. Opere matematiche. Memorie e note. Vol. 1, 1954; Vol. 2, 1956; Vol. 3, 1957; Vol. 4, 1960; Vol. 5, 1962; Accademia dei Lincei.

== See also ==
- Volterra (crater)
- Volterra's function
- Lotka–Volterra equation
- Smith–Volterra–Cantor set
- Volterra integral equation
- Volterra series
- Product integral
- Volterra operator
- Volterra space
- Volterra Semiconductor
- Poincaré lemma

== Biographical references ==
- Castelnuovo, G. (1943), "Vito Volterra" (PDF), Rendiconti della Accademia Nazionale delle Scienze Detta dei XL, Memorie di Matematica e Applicazioni, Serie 3 (in Italian), XXV (70): 87–95, MR 0021530, Zbl 0061.00605, archived from the original (PDF) on 5 March 2016.
- Fichera, Gaetano (1992), "La figura di Vito Volterra a cinquanta anni dalla morte", in Amaldi, E.; Amerio, L.; Fichera, G.; Gregory, T.; Grioli, G.; Martinelli, E.; Montalenti, G.; Pignedoli, A.; Salvini, Giorgio; Scorza Dragoni, Giuseppe (eds.), Convegno internazionale in memoria di Vito Volterra (8–11 ottobre 1990), Atti dei Convegni Lincei (in Italian), vol. 92, Roma: Accademia Nazionale dei Lincei, pp. 25–76, ISSN 0391-805X, MR 1783027, Zbl 0973.01024. "Vito Volterra fifty years after his death" is a detailed biographical survey paper on Vito Volterra, dealing mainly with scientific, philosophical and moral aspects of his personality.
- Gemelli, Agostino (1942), "La relazione del presidente" [The president's relation] (PDF), Acta Pontificia Academia Scientarum, 6: XI–XXIV. The commemorative address pronounced by Agostino Gemelli on the occasion of the first seance of the fourth academic year of Pontifical Academy of Sciences: it includes his commemoration of various deceased members.
- Goodstein, Judith R. (2007), The Volterra Chronicles: The Life and Times of an Extraordinary Mathematician 1860–1940, History of Mathematics, vol. 31, Providence, RI-London: American Mathematical Society/London Mathematical Society, ISBN 978-0-8218-3969-0, MR 2287463, Zbl 1123.01016. See also the review in American Scientist.
- Pancaldi, Giuliano (1993), "Vito Volterra: Cosmopolitan Ideals and Nationality in the Italian Scientific Community between the Belle époque and the First World War", Minerva, 31 (1): 21–37, doi:10.1007/BF01096170, ISSN 0026-4695, S2CID 144918235.
- Pontifical Academy of Sciences (1937), "Vito Volterra" (PDF), Annuario della Pontificia Accademia delle Scienze I. 1936–37, Extra Series, vol. 1, Città del Vaticano: Pontificia Academia Scientiarum, pp. 758–775.
- Somigliana, Carlo (1942), "Vito Volterra. Discorso commemorativo pronunciato nella Prima Tornata Ordinaria del Sesto Anno Accademico, il 30 novembre 1941 (cum 2 tab.)" [Commemorative address pronounced on the occasion of the first seance of the sixth academic year, on 30 November 1941] (PDF), Acta Pontificia Academia Scientarum, 6: 57–86, JFM 68.0018.15, MR 0026620, Zbl 0060.01808. The commemorative address by Carlo Somigliana, colleague and friend of Vito Volterra.

== General references ==
- Accardi, Luigi (1992), "Vito Volterra and the development of functional analysis", in Amaldi, E.; Amerio, L.; Fichera, G.; Gregory, T.; Grioli, G.; Martinelli, E.; Montalenti, G.; Pignedoli, A.; Salvini, Giorgio; Scorza Dragoni, Giuseppe (eds.), Convegno internazionale in memoria di Vito Volterra (8–11 ottobre 1990) [International congress in memory of Vito Volterra (October 8–11, 1990)], Atti dei Convegni Lincei, vol. 92, Roma: Accademia Nazionale dei Lincei, pp. 151–181, ISSN 0391-805X, MR 1783028, Zbl 0980.01016. In this paper Luigi Accardi describes the early research work of Vito Volterra on functionals, leading to the creation of functional analysis.
- Amaldi, E.; Amerio, L.; Fichera, G.; Gregory, T.; Grioli, G.; Martinelli, E.; Montalenti, G.; Pignedoli, A.; Salvini, Giorgio; Scorza Dragoni, Giuseppe, eds. (1992), Convegno internazionale in memoria di Vito Volterra (8–11 ottobre 1990) [International congress in memory of Vito Volterra (October 8–11, 1990)], Atti dei Convegni Lincei (in English, French, and Italian), vol. 92, Roma: Accademia Nazionale dei Lincei, p. 346, ISSN 0391-805X.
- Graffi, Dario (1992), "L'opera di Vito Volterra sui fenomeni ereditari e alcune sue conseguenze", in Amaldi, E.; Amerio, L.; Fichera, G.; Gregory, T.; Grioli, G.; Martinelli, E.; Montalenti, G.; Pignedoli, A.; Salvini, Giorgio; Scorza Dragoni, Giuseppe (eds.), Convegno internazionale in memoria di Vito Volterra (8–11 ottobre 1990) [International congress in memory of Vito Volterra (October 8–11, 1990)], Atti dei Convegni Lincei (in Italian), vol. 92, Roma: Accademia Nazionale dei Lincei, pp. 39–76, ISSN 0391-805X, MR 1783028, Zbl 0977.01022. "The work of Vito Volterra on hereditary phenomena and some of their consequences" is an ample technical survey paper on the research work of Vito Volterra on hereditary phenomena in mathematical physics.
- Israel, G. (2005), "Book on mathematical biology", in Grattan-Guinness, I. (ed.), Landmark Writings in Western Mathematics, 1640–1940, Amsterdam: Elsevier, pp. xxvi+310, ISBN 978-0-444-50871-3, MR 0408866, Zbl 1090.01002
- Israel, G. (1988). "On the contribution of Volterra and Lotka to the development of modern biomathematics". History and Philosophy of the Life Sciences. 10 (1): 37–49. PMID 3045853.
- Scudo, F. (1971). "Vito Volterra and theoretical ecology". Theoretical Population Biology. 2 (1): 1–23. Bibcode:1971TPBio...2....1S. doi:10.1016/0040-5809(71)90002-5. PMID 4950157..
- Scudo, Francesco M. (1992), "Vito Volterra, "Ecology" and the quantification of "Darwinism"", in Amaldi, E.; Amerio, L.; Fichera, G.; Gregory, T.; Grioli, G.; Martinelli, E.; Montalenti, G.; Pignedoli, A.; Salvini, Giorgio; Scorza Dragoni, Giuseppe (eds.), Convegno internazionale in memoria di Vito Volterra (8–11 ottobre 1990) [International congress in memory of Vito Volterra (October 8–11, 1990)], Atti dei Convegni Lincei, vol. 92, Roma: Accademia Nazionale dei Lincei, pp. 313–333, ISSN 0391-805X, MR 1783041, Zbl 0978.01026.
