= Operator norm =

Measure of the "size" of linear operators

In mathematics, the operator norm measures the "size" of certain linear operators by assigning each a real number called its operator norm. Formally, it is a norm defined on the space of bounded linear operators between two given normed vector spaces. Informally, the operator norm $\|T\|$ of a linear map $T : X \to Y$ is the maximum factor by which it "lengthens" vectors. It is also called the bound norm.

== Introduction and definition ==
Given two normed vector spaces $V$ and $W$ (over the same base field, either the real numbers $\R$ or the complex numbers $\Complex$), a linear map $A : V \to W$ is continuous if and only if there exists a real number $c$ such that
$$\|Av\| \leq c \|v\| \quad \text{ for all } v\in V.$$

The norm on the left is the one in $W$ and the norm on the right is the one in $V$. Intuitively, the continuous operator $A$ never increases the length of any vector by more than a factor of $c.$ Thus the image of a bounded set under a continuous operator is also bounded. Because of this property, the continuous linear operators are also known as bounded operators. In order to "measure the size" of $A,$ one can take the infimum of the numbers $c$ such that the above inequality holds for all $v \in V.$ This number represents the maximum scalar factor by which $A$ "lengthens" vectors. In other words, the "size" of $A$ is measured by how much it "lengthens" vectors in the "biggest" case. So we define the operator norm of $A$ as
$$\|A\|_\text{op} = \inf\{ c \geq 0 : \|Av\| \leq c \|v\| \text{ for all } v \in V \}.$$

The infimum is attained as the set of all such $c$ is closed, nonempty, and bounded from below.

It is important to bear in mind that this operator norm depends on the choice of norms for the normed vector spaces $V$ and $W$.

== Examples ==
Every real $m$-by-$n$ matrix corresponds to a linear map from $\R^n$ to $\R^m.$ Each pair of the plethora of (vector) norms applicable to real vector spaces induces an operator norm for all $m$-by-$n$ matrices of real numbers; these induced norms form a subset of matrix norms.

If we specifically choose the Euclidean norm on both $\R^n$ and $\R^m,$ then the matrix norm given to a matrix $A$ is the square root of the largest eigenvalue of the matrix $A^{*} A$ (where $A^{*}$ denotes the conjugate transpose of $A$). This is equivalent to assigning the largest singular value of $A.$

Passing to a typical infinite-dimensional example, consider the sequence space $\ell^2,$ which is an L^{p} space, defined by
$$\ell^2 = \left\{ (a_n)_{n \geq 1} : \; a_n \in \Complex, \; \sum_n |a_n|^2 < \infty \right\}.$$

This can be viewed as an infinite-dimensional analogue of the Euclidean space $\Complex^n.$ Now consider a bounded sequence $s_{\bull} = \left(s_n\right)_{n=1}^\infty.$ The sequence $s_{\bull}$ is an element of the space $\ell^\infty,$ with a norm given by
$$\left\|s_{\bull}\right\|_\infty = \sup _n \left|s_n\right|.$$

Define an operator $T_s$ by pointwise multiplication:
$$\left(a_n\right)_{n=1}^{\infty} \;\stackrel{T_s}{\mapsto}\;\ \left(s_n \cdot a_n\right)_{n=1}^{\infty}.$$

The operator $T_s$ is bounded with operator norm
$$\left\|T_s\right\|_\text{op} = \left\|s_{\bull}\right\|_\infty.$$

This discussion extends directly to the case where $\ell^2$ is replaced by a general $L^p$ space with $p > 1$ and $\ell^\infty$ replaced by $L^\infty.$

== Equivalent definitions ==
Let $A : V \to W$ be a linear operator between normed spaces. The first four definitions are always equivalent, and if in addition $V \neq \{0\}$ then they are all equivalent:

$$\begin{alignat}{4}
\|A\|_\text{op} &= \inf &&\{ c \geq 0 ~&&:~ \| A v \| \leq c \| v \| ~&&~ \text{ for all } ~&&v \in V \} \\
&= \sup &&\{ \| Av \| ~&&:~ \| v \| \leq 1 ~&&~\mbox{ and } ~&&v \in V \} \\
&= \sup &&\{ \| Av \| ~&&:~ \| v \| < 1 ~&&~\mbox{ and } ~&&v \in V \} \\
&= \sup &&\{ \| Av \| ~&&:~ \| v \| \in \{0,1\}  ~&&~\mbox{ and } ~&&v \in V \} \\
&= \sup &&\{ \| Av \| ~&&:~ \| v \| = 1 ~&&~\mbox{ and } ~&&v \in V \}  \;\;\;\text{ this equality holds if and only if } V \neq \{ 0 \} \\
&= \sup &&\bigg\{ \frac{\| Av \|}{\| v \|} ~&&:~ v \ne 0 ~&&~\mbox{ and } ~&&v \in V \bigg\}  \;\;\;\text{ this equality holds if and only if } V \neq \{ 0 \}. \\
\end{alignat}$$

If $V = \{0\}$ then the sets in the last two rows will be empty, and consequently their supremums over the set $[-\infty, \infty]$ will equal $-\infty$ instead of the correct value of $0.$ If the supremum is taken over the set $[0, \infty]$ instead, then the supremum of the empty set is $0$ and the formulas hold for any $V.$

Importantly, a linear operator $A : V \to W$ is not, in general, guaranteed to achieve its norm $\|A\|_\text{op} = \sup \{\|A v\| : \|v\| \leq 1, v \in V\}$ on the closed unit ball $\{v \in V : \|v\| \leq 1\},$ meaning that there might not exist any vector $u \in V$ of norm $\|u\| \leq 1$ such that $\|A\|_\text{op} = \|A u\|$ (if such a vector does exist and if $A \neq 0,$ then $u$ would necessarily have unit norm $\|u\| = 1$). R.C. James proved James's theorem in 1964, which states that a Banach space $V$ is reflexive if and only if every bounded linear functional $f \in V^*$ achieves its norm on the closed unit ball. It follows, in particular, that every non-reflexive Banach space has some bounded linear functional (a type of bounded linear operator) that does not achieve its norm on the closed unit ball.

If $A : V \to W$ is bounded then
$$\|A\|_\text{op} = \sup \left\{\left|w^*(A v)\right| : \|v\| \leq 1, \left\|w^*\right\| \leq 1 \text{ where } v \in V, w^* \in W^*\right\}$$
and
$$\|A\|_\text{op} = \left\|{}^tA\right\|_\text{op}$$
where ${}^t A : W^* \to V^*$ is the transpose of $A : V \to W,$ which is the linear operator defined by $w^* \,\mapsto\, w^* \circ A.$

== Properties ==
The operator norm is indeed a norm on the space of all bounded operators between $V$ and $W$. This means
$$\|A\|_\text{op} \geq 0 \mbox{ and } \|A\|_\text{op} = 0 \mbox{ if and only if } A = 0,$$
$$\|aA\|_\text{op} = |a| \|A\|_\text{op} \mbox{ for every scalar } a ,$$
$$\|A + B\|_\text{op} \leq \|A\|_\text{op} + \|B\|_\text{op}.$$

The following inequality is an immediate consequence of the definition:
$$\|Av\| \leq \|A\|_\text{op} \|v\| \ \mbox{ for every }\ v \in V.$$

The operator norm is also compatible with the composition, or multiplication, of operators: if $V$, $W$ and $X$ are three normed spaces over the same base field, and $A : V \to W$ and $B : W \to X$ are two bounded operators, then it is a sub-multiplicative norm, that is:
$$\|BA\|_\text{op} \leq \|B\|_\text{op} \|A\|_\text{op}.$$

For bounded operators on $V$, this implies that operator multiplication is jointly continuous.

It follows from the definition that if a sequence of operators converges in operator norm, it converges uniformly on bounded sets.

== Table of common operator norms ==
By choosing different norms for the codomain, used in computing $\|Av\|$, and the domain, used in computing $\|v\|$, we obtain different values for the operator norm. Some common operator norms are easy to calculate, and others are NP-hard. Except for the NP-hard norms, all these norms can be calculated in $N^2$ operations (for an $N \times N$ matrix), with the exception of the $\ell_2 - \ell_2$ norm (which requires $N^3$ operations for the exact answer, or fewer if you approximate it with the power method or Lanczos iterations).

Computability of Operator Norms
| | | Co-domain | | |
| | | $\ell_1$ | $\ell_2$ | $\ell_\infty$ |
|---|---|---|---|---|
| Domain | $\ell_1$ | Maximum $\ell_1$ norm of a column | Maximum $\ell_2$ norm of a column | Maximum $\ell_{\infty}$ norm of a column |
| Domain | $\ell_2$ | NP-hard | Maximum singular value | Maximum $\ell_2$ norm of a row |
| Domain | $\ell_\infty$ | NP-hard | NP-hard | Maximum $\ell_1$ norm of a row |

The norm of the adjoint or transpose can be computed as follows. We have that for any $p, q,$ then $\|A\|_{p\rightarrow q} = \|A^*\|_{q'\rightarrow p'}$ where $p', q'$ are Hölder conjugate to $p, q,$ that is, $1/p + 1/p' = 1$ and $1/q + 1/q' = 1.$

== Operators on a Hilbert space ==
Suppose $H$ is a real or complex Hilbert space. If $A : H \to H$ is a bounded linear operator, then we have
$$\|A\|_\text{op} = \left\|A^*\right\|_\text{op}$$
and
$$\left\|A^* A\right\|_\text{op} = \|A\|_\text{op}^2,$$
where $A^{*}$ denotes the adjoint operator of $A$ (which in Euclidean spaces with the standard inner product corresponds to the conjugate transpose of the matrix $A$).

In general, the spectral radius of $A$ is bounded above by the operator norm of $A$:
$$\rho(A) \leq \|A\|_\text{op}.$$

To see why equality may not always hold, consider the Jordan canonical form of a matrix in the finite-dimensional case. Because there are non-zero entries on the superdiagonal, equality may be violated. The quasinilpotent operators is one class of such examples. A nonzero quasinilpotent operator $A$ has spectrum $\{0\}.$ So $\rho(A) = 0$ while $\|A\|_\text{op} > 0.$

However, when a matrix $N$ is normal, its Jordan canonical form is diagonal (up to unitary equivalence); this is the spectral theorem. In that case it is easy to see that
$$\rho(N) = \|N\|_\text{op}.$$

This formula can sometimes be used to compute the operator norm of a given bounded operator $A$: define the Hermitian operator $B = A^{*} A,$ determine its spectral radius, and take the square root to obtain the operator norm of $A.$

The space of bounded operators on $H,$ with the topology induced by operator norm, is not separable. For example, consider the Lp space $L^2[0, 1],$ which is a Hilbert space. For $0 < t \leq 1,$ let $\Omega_t$ be the characteristic function of $[0, t],$ and $P_t$ be the multiplication operator given by $\Omega_t,$ that is,
$$P_t (f) = f \cdot \Omega_t.$$

Then each $P_t$ is a bounded operator with operator norm 1 and
$$\left\|P_t - P_s\right\|_\text{op} = 1 \quad \mbox{ for all } \quad t \neq s.$$

But $\{P_t : 0 < t \leq 1\}$ is an uncountable set. This implies the space of bounded operators on $L^2([0, 1])$ is not separable, in operator norm. One can compare this with the fact that the sequence space $\ell^{\infty}$ is not separable.

The associative algebra of all bounded operators on a Hilbert space, together with the operator norm and the adjoint operation, yields a C*-algebra.

== See also ==
- Banach–Mazur compactum – Concept in functional analysis
- Continuous linear operator – Function between topological vector spaces
- Contraction (operator theory) – Bounded operators with sub-unit norm
- Discontinuous linear map
- Dual norm – Measurement on a normed vector space
- Matrix norm – Norm on a vector space of matrices
- Norm (mathematics) – Length in a vector space
- Normed space – Vector space on which a distance is defined
- Operator algebra – Branch of functional analysis
- Operator theory – Mathematical field of study
- Topologies on the set of operators on a Hilbert space
- Unbounded operator – Linear operator defined on a dense linear subspace
