= Volterra (crater) =

Crater on the Moon

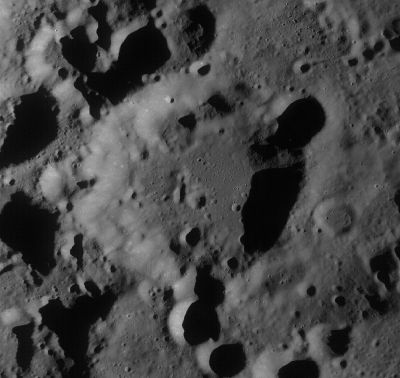
- LRO image
- Coordinates: 56.8°N 132.2°E
- Diameter: 52 km
- Depth: Unknown
- Colongitude: 230° at sunrise
- Eponym: Vito Volterra

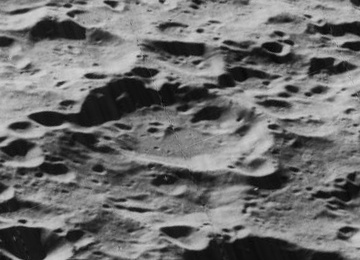
Oblique Lunar Orbiter 5 image

Volterra is a lunar impact crater that is located in the northern latitudes on the far side of the Moon. To the northeast is the crater Olivier, and to the south-southwest lies von Békésy. This is an eroded crater formation, particularly along the western side where the rim is more uneven. A small crater lies across the northeast rim edge. The interior floor is relatively level in the eastern half, while the west is marked by several remnants of small craterlets in the surface.

== Satellite craters ==
By convention these features are identified on lunar maps by placing the letter on the side of the crater midpoint that is closest to Volterra.

Volterra	Latitude	Longitude	Diameter
R	56.2° N	129.6° E	31 km
