= Mark Tomforde =

American mathematician

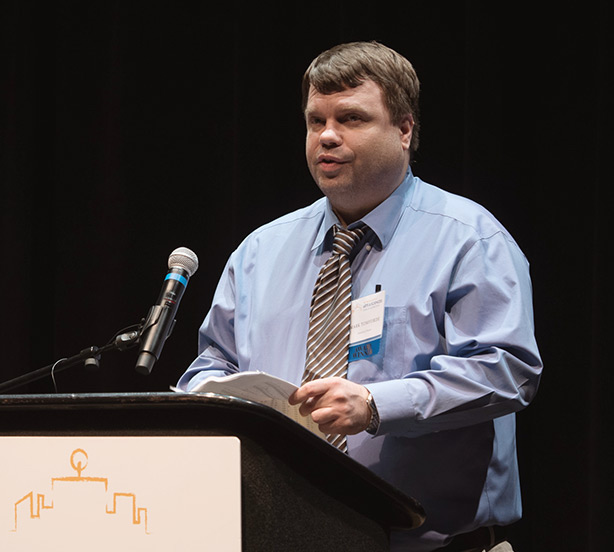
- Education: Dartmouth College, Ph.D. (2002)
- Scientific career
- Workplaces: University of Colorado Colorado Springs, University of Houston
- Thesis: Extensions of Graph C*-algebras (2002)
- Doctoral advisor: Dana P. Williams
- Website: https://www.marktomforde.com

Mark Louis Tomforde is an American mathematician who works on operator algebras and C*-algebras, topics in the broader area of functional analysis. He held academic positions at the University of Houston and at the University of Colorado Colorado Springs.

== Biography ==
Tomforde earned his Ph.D. in mathematics at Dartmouth College in 2002.

He was an invited speaker at the 2015 Abel Symposium, and he is a founding member of the Algebras and Rings in Colorado Springs (ARCS) center. Tomforde has researched the related areas of graph C*-algebras and Leavitt path algebras. With Doug Drinen, he is co-creator of the Drinen–Tomforde desingularization, often simply called desingularization. With Gene Abrams, Tomforde has formulated the Abrams–Tomforde conjectures, and Abrams and Tomforde have verified certain special cases of the conjectures. Tomforde studied ultragraph C*-algebras. Tomforde has also been active in organizing several conferences on graph C*-algebras and their generalizations, with the goal of bringing together analysts and algebraists to share ideas and collaborate.

Tomforde created and directed the Cougars and Houston Area Mathematics Program (CHAMP), which was last active in Spring 2019. CHAMP had previously received an award from Phi Beta Kappa and the Award for Mathematics Programs that Make a Difference from the American Mathematical Society. In 2019 Tomforde was recognized with the MAA Texas Section's Distinguished College and University Teaching of Mathematics Award. In 2020 he was a recipient of a Deborah and Franklin Haimo Award for Distinguished College or University Teaching of Mathematics from the Mathematical Association of America.
