= Ultragraph C*-algebra =

In mathematics, an ultragraph C*-algebra is a universal C*-algebra generated by partial isometries on a collection of Hilbert spaces constructed from ultragraphs.^{pp. 6-7}. These C*-algebras were created in order to simultaneously generalize the classes of graph C*-algebras and Exel–Laca algebras, giving a unified framework for studying these objects. This is because every graph can be encoded as an ultragraph, and similarly, every infinite graph giving an Exel-Laca algebras can also be encoded as an ultragraph.

== Definitions ==
=== Ultragraphs ===
An ultragraph $\mathcal{G} = (G^0, \mathcal{G}^1, r, s)$ consists of a set of vertices $G^0$, a set of edges $\mathcal{G}^1$, a source map $s:\mathcal{G}^1 \to G^0$, and a range map $r : \mathcal{G}^1 \to P(G^0) \setminus \{ \emptyset \}$ taking values in the power set collection $P(G^0) \setminus \{ \emptyset \}$ of nonempty subsets of the vertex set. A directed graph is the special case of an ultragraph in which the range of each edge is a singleton, and ultragraphs may be thought of as generalized directed graph in which each edges starts at a single vertex and points to a nonempty subset of vertices.

==== Example ====
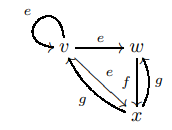
Ultragraph $(\{v,w,x\},\{e,f,g\},s,r)$

An easy way to visualize an ultragraph is to consider a directed graph with a set of labelled vertices, where each label corresponds to a subset in the image of an element of the range map. For example, given an ultragraph with vertices and edge labels

$G^0 = \{v,w,x \}$, $\mathcal{G}^1 = \{e,f,g \}$

with source an range maps

$$\begin{matrix}
s(e) = v & s(f) = w & s(g) = x \\
r(e) = \{v,w,x \} & r(f) = \{x \} & r(g) = \{v,w \}
\end{matrix}$$

can be visualized as the image on the right.

=== Ultragraph algebras ===
Given an ultragraph $\mathcal{G} = (G^0, \mathcal{G}^1, r, s)$, we define $\mathcal{G}^0$ to be the smallest subset of $P(G^0)$ containing the singleton sets $\{ \{ v \} : v \in G^0 \}$, containing the range sets $\{ r(e) : e \in \mathcal{G}^1 \}$, and closed under intersections, unions, and relative complements. A Cuntz–Krieger $\mathcal{G}$-family is a collection of projections $\{ p_A : A \in \mathcal{G}^0 \}$ together with a collection of partial isometries $\{ s_e : e \in \mathcal{G}^1 \}$ with mutually orthogonal ranges satisfying

1. $p_{\emptyset}$, $p_A p_B = p_{A \cap B}$, $p_A + p_B - p_{A \cap B} = p_{A \cup B}$ for all $A \in \mathcal{G}^0$,
2. $s_e^*s_e = p_{r(e)}$ for all $e \in \mathcal{G}^1$,
3. $p_v = \sum_{s(e)=v} s_e s_e^*$ whenever $v \in G^0$ is a vertex that emits a finite number of edges, and
4. $s_e s_e^* \le p_{s(e)}$ for all $e \in \mathcal{G}^1$.

The ultragraph C*-algebra $C^*(\mathcal{G})$ is the universal C*-algebra generated by a Cuntz–Krieger $\mathcal{G}$-family.

== Properties ==
Every graph C*-algebra is seen to be an ultragraph algebra by simply considering the graph as a special case of an ultragraph, and realizing that $\mathcal{G}^0$ is the collection of all finite subsets of $G^0$ and $p_A = \sum_{v \in A} p_v$ for each $A \in \mathcal{G}^0$. Every Exel–Laca algebras is also an ultragraph C*-algebra: If $A$ is an infinite square matrix with index set $I$ and entries in $\{ 0, 1 \}$, one can define an ultragraph by $G^0 :=$, $G^1 := I$, $s(i) = i$, and $r(i) = \{ j \in I : A(i,j)=1 \}$. It can be shown that $C^*(\mathcal{G})$ is isomorphic to the Exel–Laca algebra $\mathcal{O}_A$.

Ultragraph C*-algebras are useful tools for studying both graph C*-algebras and Exel–Laca algebras. Among other benefits, modeling an Exel–Laca algebra as ultragraph C*-algebra allows one to use the ultragraph as a tool to study the associated C*-algebras, thereby providing the option to use graph-theoretic techniques, rather than matrix techniques, when studying the Exel–Laca algebra. Ultragraph C*-algebras have been used to show that every simple AF-algebra is isomorphic to either a graph C*-algebra or an Exel–Laca algebra. They have also been used to prove that every AF-algebra with no (nonzero) finite-dimensional quotient is isomorphic to an Exel–Laca algebra.

While the classes of graph C*-algebras, Exel–Laca algebras, and ultragraph C*-algebras each contain C*-algebras not isomorphic to any C*-algebra in the other two classes, the three classes have been shown to coincide up to Morita equivalence.

== See also ==
- Leavitt path algebra
- Exel–Laca algebras
- Infinite matrix
- Infinite graph
