= Hilbert C*-module =

Mathematical objects that generalise the notion of Hilbert spaces

Hilbert C*-modules are mathematical objects that generalise the notion of Hilbert spaces (which are themselves generalisations of Euclidean space), in that they endow a linear space with an "inner product" that takes values in a C*-algebra.

They were first introduced in the work of Irving Kaplansky in 1953, which developed the theory for commutative, unital algebras (though Kaplansky observed that the assumption of a unit element was not "vital").

In the 1970s the theory was extended to non-commutative C*-algebras independently by William Lindall Paschke and Marc Rieffel, the latter in a paper that used Hilbert C*-modules to construct a theory of induced representations of C*-algebras.

Hilbert C*-modules are crucial to Kasparov's formulation of KK-theory, and provide the right framework to extend the notion of Morita equivalence to C*-algebras. They can be viewed as the generalization of vector bundles to noncommutative C*-algebras and as such play an important role in noncommutative geometry, notably in C*-algebraic quantum group theory, and groupoid C*-algebras.

== Definitions ==
=== Inner-product C*-modules ===
Let $A$ be a C*-algebra (not assumed to be commutative or unital), its involution denoted by ${}^*$. An inner-product $A$-module (or pre-Hilbert $A$-module) is a complex linear space $E$ equipped with a compatible right $A$-module structure, together with a map

$$\langle \, \cdot \, , \, \cdot \,\rangle_A : E \times E \rightarrow A$$

that satisfies the following properties:

- For all $x$, $y$, $z$ in $E$, and $\alpha$, $\beta$ in $\mathbb{C}$:

$$\langle x ,y \alpha  + z \beta \rangle_A =  \langle x, y \rangle_A \alpha + \langle x, z \rangle_A \beta$$

(i.e. the inner product is $\mathbb{C}$-linear in its second argument).

- For all $x$, $y$ in $E$, and $a$ in $A$:

$$\langle x, y a \rangle_A = \langle x, y \rangle_A a$$

- For all $x$, $y$ in $E$:

$$\langle x, y \rangle_A = \langle y, x \rangle_A^*,$$

from which it follows that the inner product is conjugate linear in its first argument (i.e. it is a sesquilinear form).

- For all $x$ in $E$:

$$\langle x, x \rangle_A \geq 0$$

in the sense of being a positive element of A, and

$$\langle x, x \rangle_A = 0 \iff x = 0.$$

(An element of a C*-algebra $A$ is said to be positive if it is self-adjoint with non-negative spectrum.)

=== Hilbert C*-modules ===
An analogue to the Cauchy–Schwarz inequality holds for an inner-product $A$-module $E$:

$$\langle x, y \rangle_A \langle y, x \rangle_A \leq \Vert \langle y, y \rangle_A \Vert \langle x, x \rangle_A$$

for $x$, $y$ in $E$.

On the pre-Hilbert module $E$, define a norm by

$$\Vert x \Vert = \Vert \langle x, x \rangle_A \Vert^\frac{1}{2}.$$

The norm-completion of $E$, still denoted by $E$, is said to be a Hilbert $A$-module or a Hilbert C*-module over the C*-algebra $A$. The Cauchy–Schwarz inequality implies the inner product is jointly continuous in norm and can therefore be extended to the completion.

The action of $A$ on $E$ is continuous: for all $x$ in $E$

$$a_{\lambda} \rightarrow a \Rightarrow xa_{\lambda} \rightarrow xa.$$

Similarly, if $(e_\lambda)$ is an approximate unit for $A$ (a net of self-adjoint elements of $A$ for which $a e_\lambda$ and $e_\lambda a$ tend to $a$ for each $a$ in $A$), then for $x$ in $E$

$$xe_\lambda \rightarrow x.$$

Whence it follows that $EA$ is dense in $E$, and $x 1_A = x$ when $A$ is unital.

Let

$$\langle E, E \rangle_A = \operatorname{span} \{ \langle x, y \rangle_A \mid x, y \in E \},$$

then the closure of $\langle E, E \rangle_A$ is a two-sided ideal in $A$. Two-sided ideals are C*-subalgebras and therefore possess approximate units. One can verify that $E \langle E, E \rangle_A$ is dense in $E$. In the case when $\langle E , E \rangle_A$ is dense in $A$, $E$ is said to be full. This does not generally hold.

== Examples ==
=== Hilbert spaces ===
Since the complex numbers $\mathbb{C}$ are a C*-algebra with an involution given by complex conjugation, a complex Hilbert space $\mathcal{H}$ is a Hilbert $\mathbb{C}$-module under scalar multipliation by complex numbers and its inner product.

=== Vector bundles ===
If $X$ is a locally compact Hausdorff space and $E$ a vector bundle over $X$ with projection $\pi \colon E \to X$ a Hermitian metric $g$, then the space of continuous sections of $E$ is a Hilbert $C(X)$-module. Given sections $\sigma, \rho$ of $E$ and $f \in C(X)$ the right action is defined by

$$\sigma f (x) = \sigma(x) f(\pi(x)),$$

and the inner product is given by

$$\langle \sigma,\rho\rangle_{C(X)} (x):=g(\sigma(x),\rho(x)).$$

The converse holds as well: Every countably generated Hilbert C*-module over a commutative unital C*-algebra $A = C(X)$ is isomorphic to the space of sections vanishing at infinity of a continuous field of Hilbert spaces over $X$.

=== C*-algebras ===
Any C*-algebra $A$ is a Hilbert $A$-module with the action given by right multiplication in $A$ and the inner product $\langle a , b \rangle = a^*b$. By the C*-identity, the Hilbert module norm coincides with C*-norm on $A$.

The (algebraic) direct sum of $n$ copies of $A$

$$A^n = \bigoplus_{i=1}^n A$$

can be made into a Hilbert $A$-module by defining

$$\langle (a_i), (b_i) \rangle_A = \sum_{i=1}^n a_i^* b_i.$$

If $p$ is a projection in the C*-algebra $M_n(A)$, then $pA^n$ is also a Hilbert $A$-module with the same inner product as the direct sum.

=== The standard Hilbert module ===
One may also consider the following subspace of elements in the countable direct product of $A$

$$\ell_2(A)= \mathcal{H}_A = \Big\{ (a_i) | \sum_{i=1}^{\infty} a_i^{*}a_i\text{ converges in }A \Big\}.$$

Endowed with the obvious inner product (analogous to that of $A^n$), the resulting Hilbert $A$-module is called the standard Hilbert module over $A$.

The fact that there is a unique separable Hilbert space has a generalization to Hilbert modules in the form of the Kasparov stabilization theorem, which states that if $E$ is a countably generated Hilbert $A$-module, there is an isometric isomorphism $E \oplus \ell_2(A) \cong \ell_2(A).$

== Maps between Hilbert modules ==
Let $E$ and $F$ be two Hilbert modules over the same C*-algebra $A$. These are then Banach spaces, so it is possible to speak of the Banach space of bounded linear maps $\mathcal{L}(E,F)$, normed by the operator norm.

The adjointable and compact adjointable operators are subspaces of this Banach space defined using the inner product structures on $E$ and $F$.

In the special case where $A$ is $\mathbb{C}$ these reduce to bounded and compact operators on Hilbert spaces respectively.

=== Adjointable maps ===
A map (not necessarily linear) $T \colon E \to F$ is defined to be adjointable if there is another map $T^* \colon F \to E$, known as the adjoint of $T$, such that for every $e \in E$ and $f \in F$,

$$\langle f, Te \rangle = \langle T^* f, e \rangle.$$

Both $T$ and $T^*$ are then automatically linear and also $A$-module maps. The closed graph theorem can be used to show that they are also bounded.

Analogously to the adjoint of operators on Hilbert spaces, $T^*$ is unique (if it exists) and itself adjointable with adjoint $T$. If $S \colon F \to G$ is a second adjointable map, $ST$ is adjointable with adjoint $S^* T^*$.

The adjointable operators $E \to F$ form a subspace $\mathbb{B}(E,F)$ of $\mathcal{L}(E,F)$, which is complete in the operator norm.

In the case $F = E$, the space $\mathbb{B}(E,E)$ of adjointable operators from $E$ to itself is denoted $\mathbb{B}(E)$, and is a C*-algebra.

=== Compact adjointable maps ===
Given $e \in E$ and $f \in F$, the map $| f \rangle \langle e | \colon E \to F$ is defined, analogously to the rank one operators of Hilbert spaces, to be

$$g \mapsto f \langle e, g \rangle.$$

This is adjointable with adjoint $| e \rangle \langle f |$.

The compact adjointable operators $\mathbb{K}(E,F)$ are defined to be the closed span of

$$\{ | f \rangle \langle e | \mid e \in E, \; f \in F \}$$

in $\mathbb{B}(E,F)$.

As with the bounded operators, $\mathbb{K}(E,E)$ is denoted $\mathbb{K}(E)$. This is a (closed, two-sided) ideal of $\mathbb{B}(E)$.

== C*-correspondences ==
If $A$ and $B$ are C*-algebras, an $(A,B)$ C*-correspondence is a Hilbert $B$-module equipped with a left action of $A$ by adjointable maps that is faithful. (NB: Some authors require the left action to be non-degenerate instead.) These objects are used in the formulation of Morita equivalence for C*-algebras, see applications in the construction of Toeplitz and Cuntz-Pimsner algebras, and can be employed to put the structure of a bicategory on the collection of C*-algebras.

=== Tensor products and the bicategory of correspondences ===
If $E$ is an $(A,B)$ and $F$ a $(B,C)$ correspondence, the algebraic tensor product $E \odot F$ of $E$ and $F$ as vector spaces inherits left and right $A$- and $C$-module structures respectively.

It can also be endowed with the $C$-valued sesquilinear form defined on pure tensors by

$$\langle e \odot f, e' \odot f' \rangle_C := \langle f, \langle e, e' \rangle_B f \rangle_C.$$

This is positive semidefinite, and the Hausdorff completion of $E \odot F$ in the resulting seminorm is denoted $E \otimes_B F$. The left- and right-actions of $A$ and $C$ extend to make this an $(A,C)$ correspondence.

The collection of C*-algebras can then be endowed with the structure of a bicategory, with C*-algebras as objects, $(A,B)$ correspondences as arrows $B \to A$, and isomorphisms of correspondences (bijective module maps that preserve inner products) as 2-arrows.

=== Toeplitz algebra of a correspondence ===
Given a C*-algebra $A$, and an $(A,A)$ correspondence $E$, its Toeplitz algebra $\mathcal{T}(E)$ is defined as the universal algebra for Toeplitz representations (defined below).

The classical Toeplitz algebra can be recovered as a special case, and the Cuntz-Pimsner algebras are defined as particular quotients of Toeplitz algebras.

In particular, graph algebras , crossed products by $\mathbb{Z}$ , and the Cuntz algebras are all quotients of specific Toeplitz algebras.

==== Toeplitz representations ====
A Toeplitz representation of $E$ in a C*-algebra $D$ is a pair $(S,\phi)$ of a linear map $S \colon E \to D$ and a homomorphism $\phi \colon A \to D$ such that

- $S$ is "isometric":

$S(e)^* S(f) = \phi(\langle e, f \rangle)$ for all $e,f \in E$,

- $S$ resembles a bimodule map:

$S(a e) = \phi(a) S(e)$ and $S(ea) = S(e) \phi(a)$ for $e \in E$ and $a \in A$.

==== Toeplitz algebra ====
The Toeplitz algebra $\mathcal{T}(E)$ is the universal Toeplitz representation. That is, there is a Toeplitz representation $(T, \iota)$ of $E$ in $\mathcal{T}(E)$ such that if $(S,\phi)$ is any Toeplitz representation of $E$ (in an arbitrary algebra $D$) there is a unique *-homomorphism $\Phi \colon \mathcal{T}(E) \to D$ such that $S = \Phi \circ T$ and $\phi = \Phi \circ \iota$.

==== Examples ====
If $A$ is taken to be the algebra of complex numbers, and $E$ the vector space $\mathbb{C}^n$, endowed with the natural $(\mathbb{C},\mathbb{C})$-bimodule structure, the corresponding Toeplitz algebra is the universal algebra generated by $n$ isometries with mutually orthogonal range projections.

In particular, $\mathcal{T}(\mathbb{C})$ is the universal algebra generated by a single isometry, which is the classical Toeplitz algebra.

== See also ==
- Operator algebra
