= Andreas Thom (mathematician) =

German mathematician

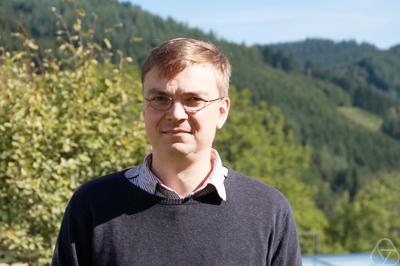
Thom at Oberwolfach, 2013

Andreas Thom is a German mathematician, working on geometric group theory, algebraic topology, ergodic theory of group actions, and operator algebras.

== Education and career ==
Thom received in 2000 his Certificate of Advanced Study in Mathematics from the University of Cambridge. In 2003 he obtained his doctorate (Promotion) from the University of Münster with thesis advisor Joachim Cuntz and thesis Connective E-Theory and Bivariant Homology for C*-Algebra. He was a Postdoc 2003–2005 at the University of Münster, and 2005–2007 at the University of Göttingen. From 2007 to 2009 he was a junior professor for Geometrical Aspects of Pure Mathematics at the University of Göttingen. After being promoted to assistant professor in Göttingen, he moved in 2009 to become a full professor for Theoretical Mathematics at the University of Leipzig. In 2014 he moved to a full professorship in geometry at TU Dresden.

His work with Gábor Kun laid the foundations for the discovery of a non-sofic group. Prior to this discovery their approach was not considered as the main line of attack on the problem, and approaches involving quantum games were considered more promising.

== Awards and honors ==
- In 2011, Thom received an ERC Starting Grant No. 277728 Geometry and Analysis of Group Rings.
- In 2016, he received an ERC Consolidator Grant No. 681207 Groups, Dynamics, and Approximation.
- In 2018, Thom was an invited speaker for a talk Finitary approximations of groups and their applications at the International Congress of Mathematicians in Rio de Janeiro.

== Selected publications ==
- Cortiñas, Guillermo; Thom, Andreas (26 September 2007). "Bivariant algebraic K-theory". Journal für die reine und angewandte Mathematik. 2007 (610): 71–123. arXiv:math/0603531. doi:10.1515/CRELLE.2007.068. S2CID 11948676.
- Thom, Andreas (1 April 2008). "L2-Cohomology for Von Neumann Algebras". Geometric and Functional Analysis. 18 (1): 251–270. arXiv:math/0601447. doi:10.1007/s00039-007-0634-7. ISSN 1420-8970. S2CID 17925213.
- Peterson, Jesse; Thom, Andreas (1 September 2011). "Group cocycles and the ring of affiliated operators". Inventiones Mathematicae. 185 (3): 561–592. arXiv:0708.4327. Bibcode:2011InMat.185..561P. doi:10.1007/s00222-011-0310-2. ISSN 1432-1297. S2CID 9916169.
- Cortiñas, Guillermo; Thom, Andreas (2012). "Algebraic geometry of topological spaces I". Acta Mathematica. 209 (1): 83–131. arXiv:0912.3635. doi:10.1007/s11511-012-0082-6. hdl:11336/19928. ISSN 0001-5962. S2CID 115170332.
- Li, Hanfeng; Thom, Andreas (2014). "Entropy, determinants, and 𝐿²-torsion". Journal of the American Mathematical Society. 27 (1): 239–292. arXiv:1202.1213. doi:10.1090/S0894-0347-2013-00778-X. ISSN 0894-0347. S2CID 6125430.
- Peterson, Jesse; Thom, Andreas (1 July 2016). "Character rigidity for special linear groups". Journal für die reine und angewandte Mathematik. 2016 (716): 207–228. arXiv:1303.4007. doi:10.1515/crelle-2014-0009. ISSN 0075-4102. S2CID 17257454.
