= Gene Abrams =

American mathematician

- Education: University of Oregon, Ph.D. (1981)
- Scientific career
- Fields: Mathematics, Algebra, Noncommutative Ring Theory, Morita Equivalence, Leavitt Path Algebras
- Institutions: University of Colorado Colorado Springs
- Thesis: Rings with Local Units (1981)
- Doctoral advisor: Frank Anderson
- Website: https://academics.uccs.edu/gabrams

Gene Abrams is an American mathematician and Professor of Mathematics at University of Colorado Colorado Springs. He works in the area of Algebra, and he earned his Ph.D. in mathematics at the University of Oregon in 1981. Abrams' research interests are in noncommutative rings and their categories of modules, and he is known for his contributions to Morita equivalence, particularly Morita equivalence for nonunital rings.

== Leavitt path algebras ==
Abrams is credited as one of the founders of the subject of Leavitt path algebras. Leavitt path algebras were simultaneously introduced in 2005 by Abrams and Gonzalo Aranda Pino as well as by Ara, Moreno, and Pardo, with neither of the two groups aware of the other's work. Abrams has stated that his inspiration for Leavitt path algebras came after attending a CBMS Conference hosted by Paul Muhly, David Pask, and Mark Tomforde at the University of Iowa in 2004. The topic of this CBMS conference was graph C*-algebras, a particular class of C*-algebras studied in functional analysis, and the talks at the conference gave Abrams the idea to introduce Leavitt path algebras as algebraic analogues of the graph C*-algebras. The Leavitt path algebras are so-named because they are constructed from the path algebra of a graph and they also generalize Leavitt algebras.

Leavitt path algebras have been investigated by dozens of mathematicians since their introduction, and Abrams has been instrumental in the development of the theory. The study of Leavitt path algebras has also promoted interactions between Analysis and Algebra, and there have been multiple conference on Leavitt path algebras aimed at bringing algebraists and analysts together to collaborate and share ideas. Abrams is also one of the coauthors, with Pere Ara and Mercedes Siles Molina, of the book Leavitt path algebras, published by Springer. In 2020 Leavitt path algebras were added to the Mathematics Subject Classification with code 16S88 under the general discipline of Associative Rings and Algebras.

== Outreach and popularization of mathematics ==
Abrams has been active in mathematics outreach and worked to popularize mathematical topics for general audiences. He is a member and organizer of the Colorado Math Circle. He has spoken at the Colorado Café Scientifique, an organization based on the French Café Philosophique, where members of the general public receive an introduction to an interesting current scientific topic from an expert. Abrams also wrote an article for the MAA FOCUS describing his experiences at the Colorado Café Scientifique and encouraging more mathematicians to become involved in this kind of public outreach.

Abrams was awarded the Carl B. Allendoerfer Award of the Mathematical Association of America in 2011 for his paper with Jessica Sklar, The Graph Menagerie: Abstract Algebra and the Mad Veterinarian. The paper describes and provides a general solution to a topic in recreational math known as the "Mad veterinarian puzzles". One example of a Mad Veterinarian Puzzle is the following:

"Suppose a mad veterinarian creates a transmogrifier that can convert one cat into two dogs and five mice, or one dog into three cats and three mice, or a mouse into a cat and a dog. It can also do each of these operations in reverse. Can it, through any sequence of operations, convert two cats into a pack of dogs? How about one cat?"

== Honors and awards ==
- Carl B. Allendoerfer Award, 2011
- Rocky Mountain Section of the Mathematical Association of America Award for Distinguished University Teaching, 2002
- University of Colorado systemwide President's Teaching Scholar, 1996
