= Wilhelm Winter =

German mathematician

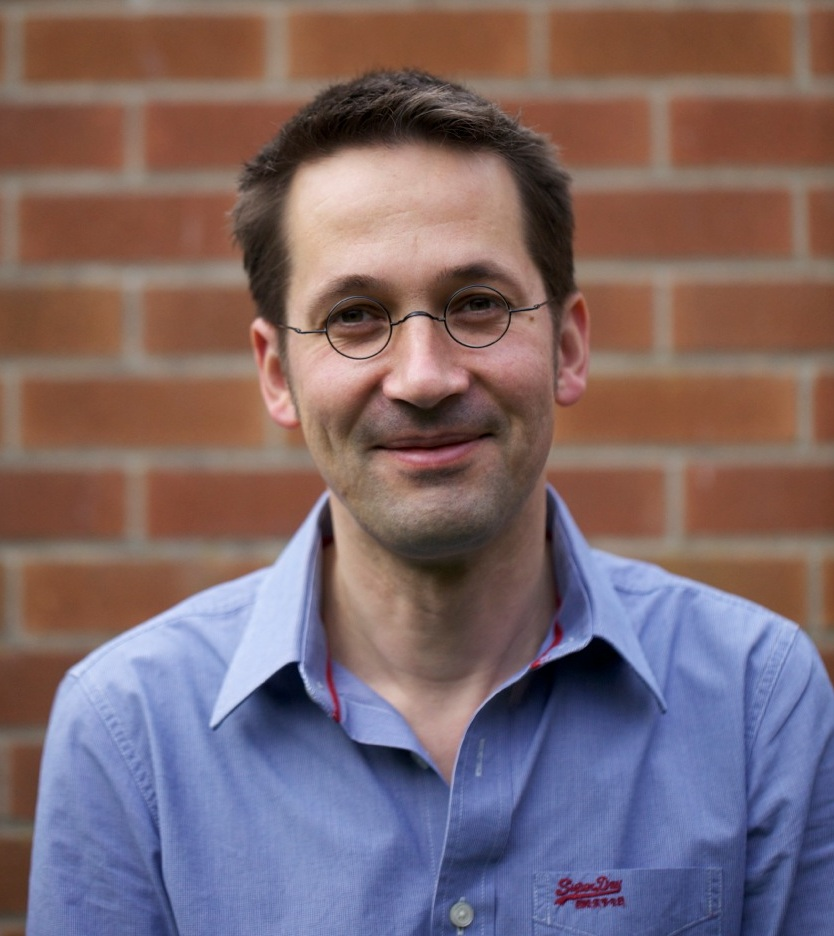
Wilhelm Winter, 2012.

Wilhelm Winter (born 1968) is a German mathematician, specializing in operator algebras (and particularly C*-algebras).

== Education and career ==
Winter received in 1996 his Diplom from the Heidelberg University and in 2000 his doctorate (Promotion) from the University of Münster with thesis advisor Joachim Cuntz and thesis Covering Dimension for Nuclear C*-Algebras. At the University of Münster he was a research assistant from 2001 to 2007 and habilitated there in 2006 in Münster. In Fall 2002 he was a visiting assistant professor at Texas A & M University. From 2007 to 2011 he was at University of Nottingham, first as a lecturer and later as a reader. Winter is a professor of mathematics at the University of Münster since 2011.

In 2010 he received with Andrew Toms the G. de B. Robinson Award. In 2018 Winter was an invited speaker with talk Structure of nuclear C*-algebras: From quasidiagonality to classification, and back again at the International Congress of Mathematicians in Rio de Janeiro.

== Selected publications ==
- Toms, Andrew S.; Winter, Wilhelm (2008). "Z-stable ASH algebras" (PDF). Canadian Journal of Mathematics. 60 (3): 703–720. doi:10.4153/cjm-2008-031-6. S2CID 14434376.
- Toms, A. S; Winter, W (2009). "Minimal dynamics and the classification of C*-algebras". Proceedings of the National Academy of Sciences. 106 (40): 16942–16943. Bibcode:2009PNAS..10616942T. doi:10.1073/pnas.0903629106. PMC 2761370. PMID 19805164.
- Winter, Wilhelm (2010). "Decomposition rank and Z-stability". Invent. Math. 179 (2): 229–301. arXiv:0806.2948. Bibcode:2010InMat.179..229W. doi:10.1007/s00222-009-0216-4. S2CID 123088958.
- Winter, Wilhelm (2012). "Nuclear dimension and Z-stability of pure C^{*}-algebras". Invent. Math. 187 (2): 259–342. arXiv:1006.2731. Bibcode:2012InMat.187..259W. doi:10.1007/s00222-011-0334-7. S2CID 123701167.
- Christensen, Erik; Sinclair, Allan M; Smith, Roger R; White, Stuart A; Winter, Wilhelm (2012). "Perturbations of nuclear C^{*}-algebras". Acta Math. 208 (1): 93–150. arXiv:0910.4953. doi:10.1007/s11511-012-0075-5. S2CID 115171105.
- Blackadar, Bruce; Robert, Leonel; Tikuisis, Aaron P; Toms, Andrew S; Winter, Wilhelm (2012). "An algebraic approach to the radius of comparison". Trans. Amer. Math. Soc. 364 (7): 3657–3674. arXiv:1008.4024. doi:10.1090/S0002-9947-2012-05538-3. S2CID 18090006.
- Sato, Yasuhiko; White, Stuart; Winter, Wilhelm (2015). "Nuclear dimension and Z-stability". Invent. Math. 202 (2): 893–921. arXiv:1403.0747. Bibcode:2015InMat.202..893S. doi:10.1007/s00222-015-0580-1. S2CID 27821911.
