= Joachim Cuntz =

German mathematician (born 1948)

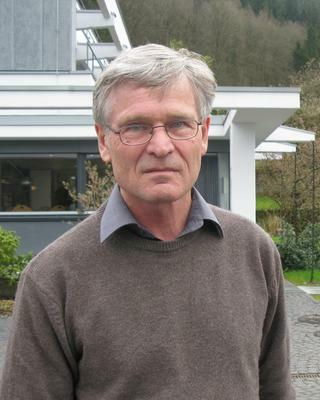
- Cuntz at Oberwolfach, 2012
- Born: 28 September 1948 (age 77)
- Citizenship: German
- Education: Bielefeld University (Ph.D., 1975)
- Known for: Cuntz algebras
- Awards: Gottfried Wilhelm Leibniz Prize (1999)
- Scientific career
- Fields: Mathematics
- Workplaces: University of Münster
- Doctoral advisor: Horst Behncke
- Doctoral students: Andreas Thom, Wilhelm Winter

Joachim Cuntz (born 28 September 1948 in Mannheim) is a German mathematician, currently a professor at the University of Münster.

== Work ==
Joachim Cuntz has made fundamental contributions to the area of C*-algebras and to the field of noncommutative geometry in the sense of Alain Connes. He initiated the analysis of the structure of simple C*-algebras and introduced new methods and examples, including the Cuntz algebras and the Cuntz semigroup. He was one of the first to apply K-theory to noncommutative operator algebras and contributed to the development of that theory. In collaboration with Daniel Quillen, he developed a new approach to cyclic cohomology and proved the excision property of periodic cyclic theory. In recent years, he has been working mainly on C*-algebras that are related to structures from number theory.

Joachim Cuntz had dozens of PhD students and research assistants, many of which are professors in mathematics today. Among them are:

- Xin Li (PhD 2010, professor of mathematics at the University of Glasgow)
- Ralf Meyer (PhD 1999, professor of mathematics at the University of Göttingen)
- Andreas Thom (PhD 2003, professor of geometry at the TU Dresden)
- Christian Voigt (PhD 2003, professor of mathematics at the University of Glasgow)
- Moritz Weber (PhD 2011, junior professor of mathematics at Saarland University)
- Wilhelm Winter (PhD 2000, professor of mathematics at the University of Münster)
- Joachim Zacharias (PhD 1996, professor of mathematics at the University of Glasgow)

== Awards and honors ==
- 1990 Invited speaker at the International Congress of Mathematicians in Kyoto (Cyclic Cohomology and K-homology).
- Max Planck Research Award (together with G. Kasparov), 1993
- Medal of the Collège de France, 1997
- Gottfried Wilhelm Leibniz Prize of the DFG 1999,
- Honorary doctorate from the University of Copenhagen
- ERC Advanced Investigators Grant, 2010
- Fellow of the American Mathematical Society, 2012
