= CHAMP (mathematics outreach program) =

Mathematics and STEM outreach program

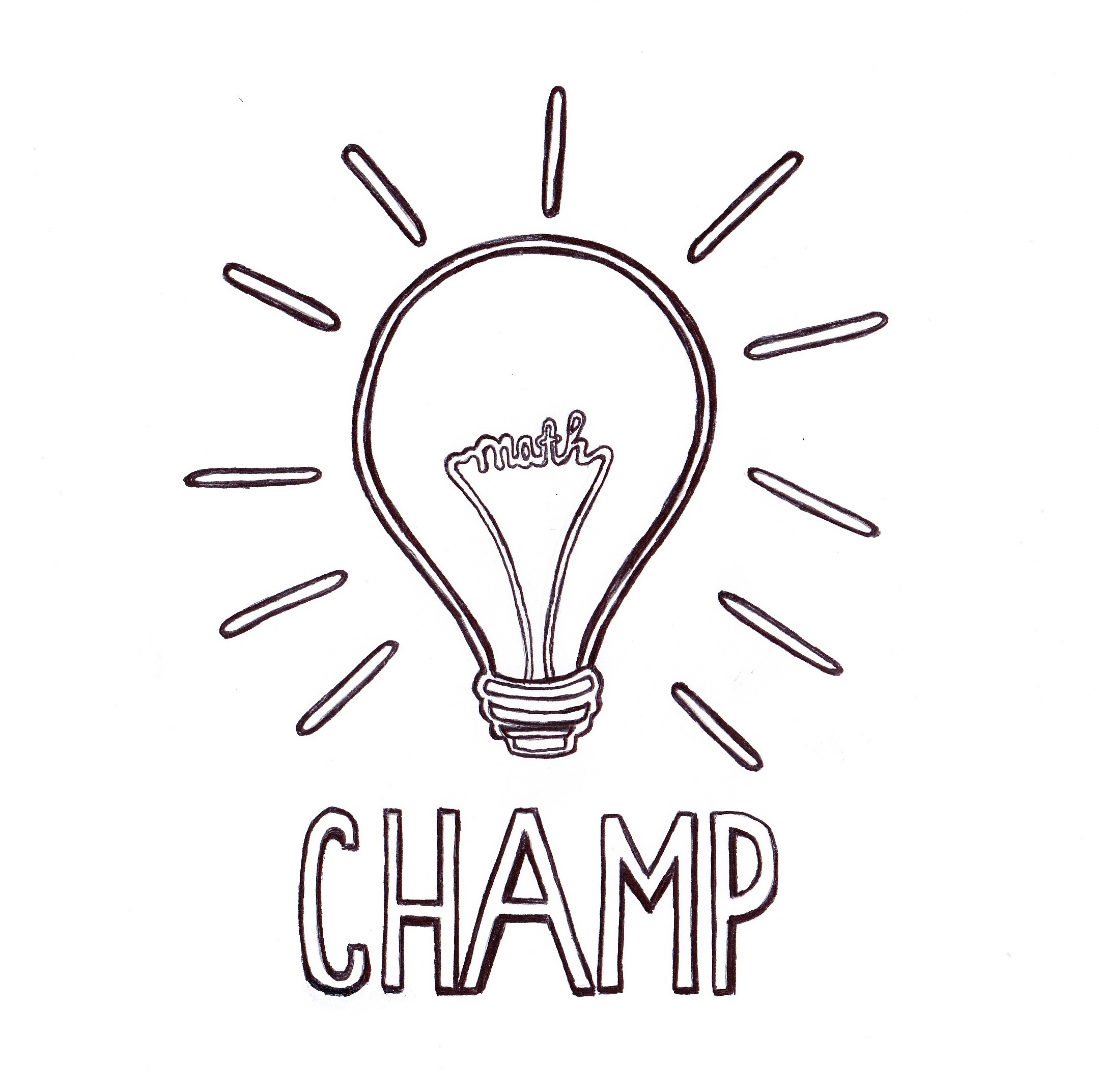
Logo for the Cougars and Houston Area Mathematics Program (CHAMP)

CHAMP (the Cougars and Houston Area Mathematics Program) is a mathematics and STEM outreach program that ran from Fall 2013–Spring 2019. CHAMP was created and directed by Mark Tomforde, and it used volunteer effort from undergraduate and graduate students to provide tutoring and mathematics lessons for high school and middle school students from underserved communities surrounding the University of Houston. CHAMP lessons were taught in an interactive style similar to a math circle.

== Impact and awards ==
In 2018 CHAMP received the Award for Mathematics Programs That Make a Difference from the American Mathematical Society. In addition to the announcement of the award, the Notices of the American Mathematical Society published an article describing the impact of CHAMP and the community of the Third Ward of Houston, which it served. CHAMP had measurable success in increasing the grit and growth mindset of the participating students, and CHAMP was commended for its successes in bringing more persons from underrepresented backgrounds into the mathematics pipeline. It was also noted that CHAMP had numerous reciprocal benefits for its graduate and undergraduate volunteers, inspiring many of them to pursue graduate studies in mathematics or pursue careers in mathematics education.

Also in 2018, CHAMP received the Phi Beta Kappa Award for Engaging Broader Audiences and both Phi Beta Kappa and the Houston Mayor's office recognized CHAMP as one of four exemplary local organizations that serve as national models for building creative exchanges with diverse audiences in the arts, humanities, social sciences, natural sciences or mathematics.

CHAMP was supported by a Tensor-SUMMA grant from the Mathematical Association of America from Fall 2015–Spring 2018.

== Resources ==
Although the program ended in 2019, CHAMP maintains a legacy website and copies of its lesson materials can be downloaded from its "Schedule Page".
