= Cuntz algebra =

Universal C*-algebra

In mathematics, the Cuntz algebra $\mathcal{O}_n$, named after Joachim Cuntz, is the universal C*-algebra generated by $n$ isometries of an infinite-dimensional Hilbert space $\mathcal{H}$ satisfying certain relations. These algebras were introduced as the first concrete examples of a separable infinite simple C*-algebra, meaning that as a Hilbert space, $\mathcal{O}_n$ is isometric to the sequence space $l^2(\mathbb{N})$, and it has no non-trivial closed ideals.

These algebras are fundamental to the study of simple infinite C*-algebras since any such algebra contains, for any given $n$, a subalgebra that has $\mathcal{O}_n$ as quotient.

== Definitions ==
Let $n\geq 2$ and $\mathcal{H}$ be a separable Hilbert space. Consider the C*-algebra $\mathcal{A}$ generated by a set $\{s_i\}_{i=1}^n$ of isometries (i.e., $s_i^*s_i = 1$) acting on $\mathcal{H}$ satisfying

$$\sum_{i=1}^n s_i s_i^* = 1.$$

This universal C*-algebra is called the Cuntz algebra, denoted by $\mathcal{O}_n$.

A simple C*-algebra is said to be purely infinite if every hereditary C*-subalgebra of it is infinite. $\mathcal{O}_n$ is a separable, simple, purely infinite C*-algebra. Any simple infinite C*-algebra contains a subalgebra that has $\mathcal{O}_n$ as a quotient.

== Properties ==
=== Classification ===
The Cuntz algebras are pairwise non-isomorphic, i.e., $\mathcal{O}_n$ and $\mathcal{O}_m$ are non-isomorphic for $n\neq m$. The K_{0} group of $\mathcal{O}_n$ is $\mathbb{Z}/(n-1)\mathbb{Z}$, the cyclic group of order $n-1$. Since $K_0$ is an isomorphism invariant, $\mathcal{O}_n$ and $\mathcal{O}_m$ are non-isomorphic.

=== Relation between concrete C*-algebras and the universal C*-algebra ===
Theorem. The concrete C*-algebra $\mathcal{A}$ is isomorphic to the universal C*-algebra $\mathcal{L}$ generated by $n$ generators $s_1,\dots,s_n$ subject to relations $s_i^*s_i=1$ for all $i$ and $\textstyle\sum s_is_i^*=1$.

The proof of the theorem hinges on the following fact: any C*-algebra generated by $n$ isometries $s_1,\dots,s_n$ with orthogonal ranges contains a copy of the UHF algebra $\mathcal{F}$ type $n^\infty$. Namely, $\mathcal{F}$ is spanned by words of the form

$$s_{i_1}\cdots s_{i_k}s_{j_1}^* \cdots s_{j_k}^*,\quad k \geq 0.$$

The *-subalgebra $\mathcal{F}$, being approximately finite-dimensional, has a unique C*-norm. The subalgebra $\mathcal{F}$ plays role of the space of Fourier coefficients for elements of the algebra. A key technical lemma, due to Cuntz, is that an element in the algebra is zero if and only if all its Fourier coefficients vanish. Using this, one can show that the quotient map from $\mathcal{L}$ to $\mathcal{A}$ is injective, which proves the theorem.

The UHF algebra $\mathcal{F}$ has a non-unital subalgebra $\mathcal{F}'$ that is canonically isomorphic to $\mathcal{F}$ itself: in the $M_n$ stage of the direct system defining $\mathcal{F}$, consider the rank-1 projection e_{11}, the matrix that is 1 in the upper left corner and zero elsewhere. Propagate this projection through the direct system. At the $M_{n^k}$ stage of the direct system, one has a rank $n^{k-1}$ projection. In the direct limit, this gives a projection $P$ in $\mathcal{F}$. The corner

$$P \mathcal{F} P  = \mathcal{F'}$$

is isomorphic to $\mathcal{F}$. The *-endomorphism $\phi$ that maps $\mathcal{F}$ onto $\mathcal{F}'$ is implemented by the isometry $s_1$, i.e., $\phi(\cdot)=s_1(\cdot)s_1^*$. $\;\mathcal{O}_n$ is in fact the crossed product of $\mathcal{F}$ with the endomorphism $\phi$.

=== Cuntz algebras to represent direct sums ===
The relations defining the Cuntz algebras align with the definition of the biproduct for preadditive categories. This similarity is made precise in the C*-category of unital *-endomorphisms over C*-algebras. The objects of this category are unital *-endomorphisms, and morphisms are the elements $a\in A$, where $a:\rho\to\sigma$ if $a\rho(b)=\sigma(b)a$ for every $b\in A$. A unital *-endomorphism $\rho:A\to A$ is the direct sum of endomorphisms $\sigma_1, \sigma_2, ..., \sigma_n$ if there are isometries $\{S_k\}_{k=1}^n$ satisfying the $\mathcal{O}_n$ relations and

$$\rho(x) = \sum_{k=1}^n S_k\sigma_k(x)S_k^*, \forall x\in A.$$

In this direct sum, the inclusion morphisms are $S_k:\sigma_k\to \rho$, and the projection morphisms are $S_k^*:\rho\to\sigma_k$.

=== Generalisations ===
Cuntz algebras have been generalised in many ways. Notable amongst which are the Cuntz–Krieger algebras, graph C*-algebras and k-graph C*-algebras.

== Applied mathematics ==
In signal processing, a subband filter with exact reconstruction give rise to representations of a Cuntz algebra. The same filter also comes from the multiresolution analysis construction in wavelet theory.

== See also ==
- Approximately finite-dimensional C*-algebra
- Hilbert C*-module
