= K-graph C*-algebra =

In mathematics, for $k \in \mathbb{N}$, a $k$-graph (also known as a higher-rank graph or graph of rank $k$) is a countable category $\Lambda$ together with a functor $d : \Lambda \to \mathbb{N}^k$, called the degree map, which satisfy the following factorization property:

if $\lambda \in \Lambda$ and $m,n \in \mathbb{N}^k$ are such that $d(\lambda) = m + n$, then there exist unique $\mu,\nu \in \Lambda$ such that $d( \mu ) = m$, $d( \nu ) = n$, and $\lambda = \mu\nu$.

An immediate consequence of the factorization property is that morphisms in a $k$-graph can be factored in multiple ways: there are also unique $\mu',\nu' \in \Lambda$ such that $d( \mu' ) = m$, $d( \nu' ) = n$, and $\mu \nu = \lambda = \nu' \mu'$.

A 1-graph is just the path category of a directed graph. In this case the degree map takes a path to its length. By extension, $k$-graphs can be considered higher-dimensional analogs of directed graphs.

Another way to think about a $k$-graph is as a $k$-colored directed graph together with additional information to record the factorization property. The $k$-colored graph underlying a $k$-graph is referred to as its skeleton. Two $k$-graphs can have the same skeleton but different factorization rules.

Kumjian and Pask originally introduced $k$-graphs as a generalization of a construction of Robertson and Steger. By considering representations of $k$-graphs as bounded operators on Hilbert space, they have since become a tool for constructing interesting C*-algebras whose structure reflects the factorization rules. Some compact quantum groups like $SU_q(3)$ can be realised as the $C^*$-algebras of $k$-graphs. There is also a close relationship between $k$-graphs and strict factorization systems in category theory.

== Notation ==
The notation for $k$-graphs is borrowed extensively from the corresponding notation for categories:

- For $n \in \mathbb{N}^k$ let $\Lambda^n = d^{-1} (n)$. By the factorisation property it follows that $\Lambda^0 = \operatorname{Obj} ( \Lambda )$.
- There are maps $s : \Lambda \to \Lambda^0$ and $r : \Lambda \to \Lambda^0$ which take a morphism $\lambda \in \Lambda$ to its source $s(\lambda)$ and its range $r(\lambda)$.
- For $v,w \in \Lambda^0$ and $X \subseteq \Lambda$ we have $v X = \{ \lambda \in X : r ( \lambda ) = v \}$, $X w = \{ \lambda \in X : s ( \lambda ) = w \}$ and $v X w = v X \cap X w$.
- If $0 < \# v \Lambda^n < \infty$ for all $v \in \Lambda^0$ and $n \in \mathbb{N}^k$ then $\Lambda$ is said to be row-finite with no sources.

== Skeletons ==
A $k$-graph $\Lambda$ can be visualized via its skeleton. Let $e_1 , \ldots , e_n$ be the canonical generators for $\mathbb{N}^k$. The idea is to think of morphisms in $\Lambda^{e_i} = d^{-1}(e_i)$ as being edges in a directed graph of a color indexed by $i$.

To be more precise, the skeleton of a $k$-graph $\Lambda$ is a k-colored directed graph $E=(E^0,E^1,r,s,c)$ with vertices $E^0 = \Lambda^0$, edges $E^1 = \cup_{i=1}^k \Lambda^{e_i}$, range and source maps inherited from $\Lambda$, and a color map $c: E^1 \to \{ 1 , \ldots , k \}$ defined by $c (e) = i$ if and only if $e \in \Lambda^{e_i}$.

The skeleton of a $k$-graph alone is not enough to recover the $k$-graph. The extra information about factorization can be encoded in a complete and associative collection of commuting squares. In particular, for each $i \ne j$ and $e,f \in E^1$ with $c(e) = i$ and $c(f) = j$, there must exist unique $e',f' \in E^1$ with $c(e') = i$, $c(f') = j$, and $ef = f'e'$ in $\Lambda$. A different choice of commuting squares can yield a distinct $k$-graph with the same skeleton.

== Examples ==
- A 1-graph is precisely the path category of a directed graph. If $\lambda$ is a path in the directed graph, then $d(\lambda)$ is its length. The factorization condition is trivial: if $\lambda$ is a path of length $m+n$ then let $\mu$ be the initial subpath of length $m$ and let $\nu$ be the final subpath of length $n$.
- The monoid $\mathbb{N}^k$ can be considered as a category with one object. The identity on $\mathbb{N}^k$ give a degree map making $\mathbb{N}^k$ into a $k$-graph.
- Let $\Omega_k = \{ (m,n) : m,n \in \mathbb{Z}^k , m \le n \}$. Then $\Omega_k$ is a category with range map $r(m,n)=(m,m)$, source map $s(m,n)=(n,n)$, and composition $(m,n)(n,p)=(m,p)$. Setting $d(m,n) = n-m$ gives a degree map. The factorization rule is given as follows: if $d(m,n) = p + q$ for some $p,q \in \mathbb{N}^k$, then $(m,n) = (m,m+q) (m+q, n)$ is the unique factorization.

== C*-algebras of k-graphs ==
Just as a graph C*-algebra can be associated to a directed graph, a universal C*-algebra can be associated to a $k$-graph.

Let $\Lambda$ be a row-finite $k$-graph with no sources then a Cuntz–Krieger $\Lambda$-family or a represenentaion of $\Lambda$ in a C*-algebra B is a map $S \colon \Lambda \to B$ such that

1. $\{ S_v : v \in \Lambda^0 \}$ is a collection of mutually orthogonal projections;
2. $S_\lambda S_\mu = S_{\lambda \mu}$ for all $\lambda,\mu \in \Lambda$ with $s(\lambda) =r(\mu)$;
3. $S_\mu^* S_\mu = S_{s ( \mu )}$ for all $\mu \in \Lambda$; and
4. $S_v = \sum_{\lambda \in v \Lambda^n} S_\lambda S_\lambda^*$ for all $n \in \mathbb{N}^k$ and $v \in \Lambda^0.$

The algebra $C^* ( \Lambda )$ is the universal C*-algebra generated by a Cuntz–Krieger $\Lambda$-family.

== See also ==
- Graph C*-algebra
