= Toeplitz algebra =

In operator algebras, the Toeplitz algebra is the C*-algebra generated by the unilateral shift on the Hilbert space l^{2}(N). Identifying l^{2}(N) with the Hardy space H^{2}, the Toeplitz algebra consists of elements of the form

$$T_f + K\;$$

where $T_f$ is a Toeplitz operator with continuous symbol $f$ and K is a compact operator.

Toeplitz operators with continuous symbols commute modulo the compact operators. So the Toeplitz algebra can be viewed as the C*-algebra extension of continuous functions on the circle by the compact operators. This extension is called the Toeplitz extension.

By Atkinson's theorem, an element of the Toeplitz algebra $T_f + K\;$is a Fredholm operator if and only if the symbol $f$ of $T_f$ is invertible. In that case, the Fredholm index of $T_f + K\;$is precisely the winding number of f, the equivalence class of f in the fundamental group of the circle. This is a special case of the Atiyah-Singer index theorem.

Wold decomposition characterizes proper isometries acting on a Hilbert space. From this, together with properties of Toeplitz operators, one can conclude that the Toeplitz algebra is the universal C*-algebra generated by a proper isometry; this is Coburn's theorem.
