= Compact quantum group =

Abstract structure in mathematics

In mathematics, compact quantum groups are generalisations of compact groups, where the commutative $\mathrm{C}^*$-algebra of continuous complex-valued functions on a compact group is generalised to an abstract structure on a not-necessarily commutative unital $\mathrm{C}^*$-algebra, which plays the role of the "algebra of continuous complex-valued functions on the compact quantum group".

The basic motivation for this theory comes from the following analogy. The space of complex-valued functions on a compact Hausdorff topological space forms a commutative C*-algebra. On the other hand, by the Gelfand Theorem, a commutative C*-algebra is isomorphic to the C*-algebra of continuous complex-valued functions on a compact Hausdorff topological space, and the topological space is uniquely determined by the C*-algebra up to homeomorphism.

S. L. Woronowicz introduced the important concept of compact matrix quantum groups, which he initially called compact pseudogroups. Compact matrix quantum groups are abstract structures on which the "continuous functions" on the structure are given by elements of a C*-algebra. The geometry of a compact matrix quantum group is a special case of a noncommutative geometry.

== Formulation ==
For a compact topological group, G, there exists a C*-algebra homomorphism

$$\Delta : C(G) \to C(G) \otimes C(G)$$

where C(G) ⊗ C(G) is the minimal C*-algebra tensor product — the completion of the algebraic tensor product of C(G) and C(G) — such that

$$\Delta(f)(x,y) = f(xy)$$

for all $f \in C(G)$, and for all $x, y \in G$, where

$$(f \otimes g)(x,y) = f(x) g(y)$$

for all $f, g \in C(G)$ and all $x, y \in G$. There also exists a linear multiplicative mapping

$$\kappa : C(G) \to C(G)$$,

such that

$$\kappa(f)(x) = f(x^{-1})$$

for all $f \in C(G)$ and all $x \in G$. Strictly speaking, this does not make C(G) into a Hopf algebra, unless G is finite.

On the other hand, a finite-dimensional representation of G can be used to generate a *-subalgebra of C(G) which is also a Hopf *-algebra. Specifically, if

$$g \mapsto (u_{ij}(g))_{i,j}$$

is an n-dimensional representation of G, then

$$u_{ij} \in C(G)$$

for all i, j, and

$$\Delta(u_{ij}) = \sum_k u_{ik} \otimes u_{kj}$$

for all i, j. It follows that the *-algebra generated by $u_{ij}$ for all i, j and $\kappa(u_{ij})$ for all i, j is a Hopf *-algebra: the counit is determined by

$$\epsilon(u_{ij}) = \delta_{ij}$$

for all $i, j$ (where $\delta_{ij}$ is the Kronecker delta), the antipode is κ, and the unit is given by

$$1 = \sum_k u_{1k} \kappa(u_{k1}) = \sum_k \kappa(u_{1k}) u_{k1}.$$

== Compact matrix quantum groups ==
As a generalization, a compact matrix quantum group is defined as a pair (C, u), where C is a C*-algebra and

$$u = (u_{ij})_{i,j = 1,\dots,n}$$

is a matrix with entries in C such that

- The *-subalgebra, C_{0}, of C, which is generated by the matrix elements of u, is dense in C;
- There exists a C*-algebra homomorphism, called the comultiplication, Δ : C → C ⊗ C (here C ⊗ C is the C*-algebra tensor product - the completion of the algebraic tensor product of C and C) such that

$$\forall i, j: \qquad \Delta(u_{ij}) = \sum_k u_{ik} \otimes u_{kj};$$

- There exists a linear antimultiplicative map, called the coinverse, κ : C_{0} → C_{0} such that $\kappa(\kappa(v*)*) = v$ for all $v \in C_0$ and $\sum_k \kappa(u_{ik}) u_{kj} = \sum_k u_{ik} \kappa(u_{kj}) = \delta_{ij} I,$ where I is the identity element of C. Since κ is antimultiplicative, κ(vw) = κ(w)κ(v) for all $v, w \in C_0$.

As a consequence of continuity, the comultiplication on C is coassociative.

In general, C is a bialgebra, and C_{0} is a Hopf *-algebra.

Informally, C can be regarded as the *-algebra of continuous complex-valued functions over the compact matrix quantum group, and u can be regarded as a finite-dimensional representation of the compact matrix quantum group.

== Compact quantum groups ==
For C*-algebras A and B acting on the Hilbert spaces H and K respectively, their minimal tensor product is defined to be the norm completion of the algebraic tensor product A ⊗ B in B(H ⊗ K); the norm completion is also denoted by A ⊗ B.

A compact quantum group is defined as a pair (C, Δ), where C is a unital C*-algebra and

- Δ : C → C ⊗ C is a unital *-homomorphism satisfying (Δ ⊗ id) Δ = (id ⊗ Δ) Δ;
- the sets {(C ⊗ 1) Δ(C)} and {(1 ⊗ C) Δ(C)} are dense in C ⊗ C.

== Representations ==
A representation of the compact matrix quantum group is given by a corepresentation of the Hopf *-algebra Furthermore, a representation, v, is called unitary if the matrix for v is unitary, or equivalently, if

$$\forall i, j: \qquad \kappa(v_{ij}) = v^*_{ji}.$$

== Example ==
An example of a compact matrix quantum group is SU_{μ}(2), where the parameter μ is a positive real number.

=== First definition ===
SU_{μ}(2) = (C(SU_{μ}(2)), u), where C(SU_{μ}(2)) is the C*-algebra generated by α and γ, subject to

$$\gamma \gamma^* = \gamma^* \gamma, \ \alpha \gamma = \mu \gamma \alpha, \ \alpha \gamma^* = \mu \gamma^* \alpha, \ \alpha \alpha^* + \mu \gamma^* \gamma = \alpha^* \alpha + \mu^{-1} \gamma^* \gamma = I,$$

and

$$u = \left( \begin{matrix} \alpha & \gamma \\ - \gamma^* & \alpha^* \end{matrix} \right),$$

so that the comultiplication is determined by $\Delta(\alpha) = \alpha \otimes \alpha - \gamma \otimes \gamma^*, \Delta(\gamma) = \alpha \otimes \gamma + \gamma \otimes \alpha^*$, and the coinverse is determined by $\kappa(\alpha) = \alpha^*, \kappa(\gamma) = - \mu^{-1} \gamma, \kappa(\gamma^*) = - \mu \gamma^*, \kappa(\alpha^*) = \alpha$. Note that u is a representation, but not a unitary representation. u is equivalent to the unitary representation

$$v = \left( \begin{matrix} \alpha & \sqrt{\mu} \gamma \\ - \frac{1}{\sqrt{\mu}} \gamma^* & \alpha^* \end{matrix} \right).$$

=== Second definition ===
SU_{μ}(2) = (C(SU_{μ}(2)), w), where C(SU_{μ}(2)) is the C*-algebra generated by α and β, subject to

$$\beta \beta^* = \beta^* \beta, \ \alpha \beta = \mu \beta \alpha, \ \alpha \beta^* = \mu \beta^* \alpha, \ \alpha \alpha^* + \mu^2 \beta^* \beta = \alpha^* \alpha + \beta^* \beta = I,$$

and

$$w = \left( \begin{matrix} \alpha & \mu \beta \\ - \beta^* & \alpha^* \end{matrix} \right),$$

so that the comultiplication is determined by $\Delta(\alpha) = \alpha \otimes \alpha - \mu \beta \otimes \beta^*, \Delta(\beta) = \alpha \otimes \beta + \beta \otimes \alpha^*$, and the coinverse is determined by $\kappa(\alpha) = \alpha^*, \kappa(\beta) = - \mu^{-1} \beta, \kappa(\beta^*) = - \mu \beta^*$, $\kappa(\alpha^*) = \alpha$. Note that w is a unitary representation. The realizations can be identified by equating $\gamma = \sqrt{\mu} \beta$.

=== Limit case ===
If μ = 1, then SU_{μ}(2) is equal to the concrete compact group SU(2).
