= Universal C*-algebra =

In mathematics, a universal C*-algebra is a C*-algebra described in terms of generators and relations. In contrast to rings or algebras, where one can consider quotients by free rings to construct universal objects, C*-algebras must be realizable as algebras of bounded operators on a Hilbert space by the Gelfand-Naimark-Segal construction and the relations must prescribe a uniform bound on the norm of each generator. This means that depending on the generators and relations, a universal C*-algebra may not exist. In particular, free C*-algebras do not exist.

== C*-Algebra Relations ==
There are several problems with defining relations for C*-algebras. One is, as previously mentioned, due to the non-existence of free C*-algebras, not every set of relations defines a C*-algebra. Another problem is that one would often want to include order relations, formulas involving continuous functional calculus, and spectral data as relations. For that reason, we use a relatively roundabout way of defining C*-algebra relations. The basic motivation behind the following definitions is that we will define relations as the category of their representations.

Given a set X, the null C*-relation on X is the category $\mathcal{F}_{X}$ with objects consisting of pairs (j, A), where A is a C*-algebra and j is a function from X to A and with morphisms from (j, A) to (k, B) consisting of *-homomorphisms φ from A to B satisfying φ ∘ j = k. A C*-relation on X is a full subcategory of $\mathcal{F}_{X}$ satisfying:

1. the unique function X to {0} is an object;
2. given an injective *-homomorphism φ from A to B and a function f from X to A, if φ ∘ f is an object, then f is an object;
3. given a *-homomorphism φ from A to B and a function f from X to A, if f is an object, then φ ∘ f is an object;
4. if f_{i} is an object for i=1,2,...,n, then $\prod_{i=1}^{n} f_i: X\to \prod_{i=1}^{n} A_i$ is also an object. Furthermore, if f_{i} is an object for i in an nonempty index set I implies the product $\prod_{i\in I} f_i : X \to \prod A_i$ is also an object, then the C*-relation is compact.

Given a C*-relation R on a set X. then a function ι from X to a C*-algebra U is called a universal representation for R if

1. given a C*-algebra A and a *-homomorphism φ from U to A, φ ∘ ι is an object of R;
2. given a C*-algebra A and an object (f, A) in R, there exists a unique *-homomorphism φ from U to A such that f = φ ∘ ι. Notice that ι and U are unique up to isomorphism and U is called the universal C*-algebra for R.

A C*-relation R has a universal representation if and only if R is compact.

Given a *-polynomial p on a set X, we can define a full subcategory of $\mathcal{F}_{X}$ with objects (j, A) such that p ∘ j = 0. For convenience, we can call p a relation, and we can recover the classical concept of relations. Unfortunately, not every *-polynomial will define a compact C*-relation.

== Alternative Approach ==
Alternatively, one can use a more concrete characterization of universal C*-algebras that more closely resembles the construction in abstract algebra. Unfortunately, this restricts the types of relations that are possible. Given a set G, a relation on G is a set R consisting of pairs (p, η) where p is a *-polynomial on X and η is a non-negative real number. A representation of (G, R) on a Hilbert space H is a function ρ from X to the algebra of bounded operators on H such that $\lVert p\circ \rho(X) \rVert \leq \eta$ for all (p, η) in R. The pair (G, R) is called admissible if a representation exists and the direct sum of representations is also a representation. Then

$$\lVert z \rVert_{u} = \sup\{ \lVert \rho(z)\rVert \colon \rho \text{ is a representation of } (G,R)\}$$

is finite and defines a seminorm satisfying the C*-norm condition on the free algebra on X. The completion of the quotient of the free algebra by the ideal $\{ z \colon \lVert z \rVert_{u} = 0\}$ is called the universal C*-algebra of (G,R).

== Examples ==
- The noncommutative torus can be defined as a universal C*-algebra generated by two unitaries with a commutation relation.
- The Cuntz algebras, graph C*-algebras and k-graph C*-algebras are universal C*-algebras generated by partial isometries.
- The universal C*-algebra generated by a unitary element u has presentation $\langle u \mid u^*u = uu^* = 1\rangle$. By continuous functional calculus, this C*-algebra is the algebra of continuous functions on the unit circle in the complex plane. Any C*-algebra generated by a unitary element is isomorphic to a quotient of this universal C*-algebra.
