= Graph C*-algebra =

In mathematics, a graph C*-algebra is a universal C*-algebra constructed from a directed graph. Graph C*-algebras are direct generalizations of the Cuntz algebras and Cuntz-Krieger algebras, but the class of graph C*-algebras has been shown to also include several other widely studied classes of C*-algebras. As a result, graph C*-algebras provide a common framework for investigating many well-known classes of C*-algebras that were previously studied independently. Among other benefits, this provides a context in which one can formulate theorems that apply simultaneously to all of these subclasses and contain specific results for each subclass as special cases.

Although graph C*-algebras include numerous examples, they provide a class of C*-algebras that are surprisingly amenable to study and much more manageable than general C*-algebras. The graph not only determines the associated C*-algebra by specifying relations for generators, it also provides a useful tool for describing and visualizing properties of the C*-algebra. This visual quality has led to graph C*-algebras being referred to as "operator algebras we can see." Another advantage of graph C*-algebras is that much of their structure and many of their invariants can be readily computed. Using data coming from the graph, one can determine whether the associated C*-algebra has particular properties, describe the lattice of ideals, and compute K-theoretic invariants.

== Graph terminology ==
The terminology for graphs used by C*-algebraists differs slightly from that used by graph theorists. The term graph is typically taken to mean a directed graph $E=(E^0, E^1, r, s)$ consisting of a countable set of vertices $E^0$, a countable set of edges $E^1$, and maps $r, s : E^1 \rightarrow E^0$ identifying the range and source of each edge, respectively. A vertex $v \in E^0$ is called a sink when $s^{-1}(v) = \emptyset$; i.e., there are no edges in $E$ with source $v$. A vertex $v \in E^0$ is called an infinite emitter when $s^{-1}(v)$ is infinite; i.e., there are infinitely many edges in $E$ with source $v$. A vertex is called a singular vertex if it is either a sink or an infinite emitter, and a vertex is called a regular vertex if it is not a singular vertex. Note that a vertex $v$ is regular if and only if the number of edges in $E$ with source $v$ is finite and nonzero. A graph is called row-finite if it has no infinite emitters; i.e., if every vertex is either a regular vertex or a sink.

A path is a finite sequence of edges $e_1 e_2 \ldots e_n$ with $r(e_i) = s(e_{i+1})$ for all $1 \leq i \leq n-1$. An infinite path is a countably infinite sequence of edges $e_1 e_2 \ldots$ with $r(e_i) = s(e_{i+1})$ for all $i \geq 1$. A cycle is a path $e_1 e_2 \ldots e_n$ with $r(e_n) = s(e_1)$, and an exit for a cycle $e_1 e_2 \ldots e_n$ is an edge $f \in E^1$ such that $s(f) = s(e_i)$ and $f \neq e_i$ for some $1 \leq i \leq n$. A cycle $e_1 e_2 \ldots e_n$ is called a simple cycle if $s(e_i) \neq s(e_1)$ for all $2 \leq i \leq n$.

The following are two important graph conditions that arise in the study of graph C*-algebras.

Condition (L): Every cycle in the graph has an exit.

Condition (K): There is no vertex in the graph that is on exactly one simple cycle. That is, a graph satisfies Condition (K) if and only if each vertex in the graph is either on no cycles or on two or more simple cycles.

== The Cuntz-Krieger Relations and the universal property ==
A Cuntz-Krieger $E$-family is a collection $\left\{ s_e, p_v : e \in E^1, v \in E^0 \right\}$ in a C*-algebra such that the elements of $\left\{ s_e : e \in E^1 \right\}$ are partial isometries with mutually orthogonal ranges, the elements of $\left\{ p_v : v \in E^0 \right\}$ are mutually orthogonal projections, and the following three relations (called the Cuntz-Krieger relations) are satisfied:

1. (CK1) $s_e^*s_e = p_{r(e)}$ for all $e \in E^1$,
2. (CK2) $p_v = \sum_{s(e)=v} s_e s_e^*$ whenever $v$ is a regular vertex, and
3. (CK3) $s_e s_e^* \le p_{s(e)}$ for all $e \in E^1$.

The graph C*-algebra corresponding to $E$, denoted by $C^*(E)$, is defined to be the C*-algebra generated by a Cuntz-Krieger $E$-family that is universal in the sense that whenever $\left\{ t_e, q_v : e \in E^1, v \in E^0 \right\}$ is a Cuntz-Krieger $E$-family in a C*-algebra $A$ there exists a $*$-homomorphism $\phi : C^*(E) \to A$ with $\phi(s_e) = t_e$ for all $e \in E^1$ and $\phi(p_v)=q_v$ for all $v \in E^0$. Existence of $C^*(E)$ for any graph $E$ was established by Kumjian, Pask, and Raeburn. Uniqueness of $C^*(E)$ (up to $*$-isomorphism) follows directly from the universal property.

=== Edge Direction Convention ===
It is important to be aware that there are competing conventions regarding the "direction of the edges" in the Cuntz-Krieger relations. Throughout this article, and in the way that the relations are stated above, we use the convention first established in the seminal papers on graph C*-algebras. The alternate convention, which is used in Raeburn's CBMS book on Graph Algebras, interchanges the roles of the range map $r$ and the source map $s$ in the Cuntz-Krieger relations. The effect of this change is that the C*-algebra of a graph for one convention is equal to the C*-algebra of the graph with the edges reversed when using the other convention.

=== Row-Finite Graphs ===
In the Cuntz-Krieger relations, (CK2) is imposed only on regular vertices. Moreover, if $v \in E^0$ is a regular vertex, then (CK2) implies that (CK3) holds at $v$. Furthermore, if $v \in E^0$ is a sink, then (CK3) vacuously holds at $v$. Thus, if $E$ is a row-finite graph, the relation (CK3) is superfluous and a collection $\left\{ s_e, p_v : e \in E^1, v \in E^0 \right\}$ of partial isometries with mutually orthogonal ranges and mutually orthogonal projections is a Cuntz-Krieger $E$-family if and only if the relation in (CK1) holds at all edges in $E$ and the relation in (CK2) holds at all vertices in $E$ that are not sinks. The fact that the Cuntz-Krieger relations take a simpler form for row-finite graphs has technical consequences for many results in the subject. Not only are results easier to prove in the row-finite case, but also the statements of theorems are simplified when describing C*-algebras of row-finite graphs. Historically, much of the early work on graph C*-algebras was done exclusively in the row-finite case. Even in modern work, where infinite emitters are allowed and C*-algebras of general graphs are considered, it is common to state the row-finite case of a theorem separately or as a corollary, since results are often more intuitive and transparent in this situation.

== Examples ==
The graph C*-algebra has been computed for many graphs. Conversely, for certain classes of C*-algebras it has been shown how to construct a graph whose C*-algebra is $*$-isomorphic or Morita equivalent to a given C*-algebra of that class.

The following table shows a number of directed graphs and their C*-algebras. We use the convention that a double arrow drawn from one vertex to another and labeled $\infty$ indicates that there are a countably infinite number of edges from the first vertex to the second.

Directed Graph $E$	Graph C*-algebra $C^*(E)$
$\bullet$	$\mathbb{C}$, the complex numbers
	$C(\mathbb{T})$, the complex-valued continuous functions on the circle $\mathbb{T}$
$v_1\longrightarrow v_2\longrightarrow\cdots\longrightarrow v_{n-1}\longrightarrow v_n$	$M_n(\mathbb{C})$, the $n \times n$ matrices with entries in $\mathbb{C}$
$\bullet\longrightarrow\bullet\longrightarrow\bullet\longrightarrow\cdots$	$\mathcal{K}$, the compact operators on a separable infinite-dimensional Hilbert space
	$M_n(C(\mathbb{T}))$, the $n \times n$ matrices with entries in $C(\mathbb{T})$
	$\mathcal{O}_n$, the Cuntz algebra generated by $n$ isometries
	$\mathcal{O}_\infty$, the Cuntz algebra generated by a countably infinite number of isometries
	$\mathcal{K}^1$, the unitization of the algebra of compact operators $\mathcal{K}$
	$\mathcal{T}$, the Toeplitz algebra

The class of graph C*-algebras has been shown to contain various classes of C*-algebras. The C*-algebras in each of the following classes may be realized as graph C*-algebras up to $*$-isomorphism:

- Cuntz algebras
- Cuntz-Krieger algebras
- finite-dimensional C*-algebras
- stable AF algebras

The C*-algebras in each of the following classes may be realized as graph C*-algebras up to Morita equivalence:

- AF algebras
- Kirchberg algebras with free K_{1}-group

== Correspondence between graph and C*-algebraic properties ==
One remarkable aspect of graph C*-algebras is that the graph $E$ not only describes the relations for the generators of $C^*(E)$, but also various graph-theoretic properties of $E$ can be shown to be equivalent to C*-algebraic properties of $C^*(E)$. Indeed, much of the study of graph C*-algebras is concerned with developing a lexicon for the correspondence between these properties, and establishing theorems of the form "The graph $E$ has a certain graph-theoretic property if and only if the C*-algebra $C^*(E)$ has a corresponding C*-algebraic property." The following table provides a short list of some of the more well-known equivalences.

Property of $E$	Property of $C^*(E)$
$E$ is a finite graph and contains no cycles.	$C^*(E)$ is finite-dimensional.
The vertex set $E^0$ is finite.	$C^*(E)$ is unital (i.e., $C^*(E)$ contains a multiplicative identity).
$E$ has no cycles.	$C^*(E)$ is an AF algebra.
$E$ satisfies the following three properties: 1. Condition (L), 2. for each vertex $v$ and each infinite path $\alpha$ there exists a directed path from $v$ to a vertex on $\alpha$, and 3. for each vertex $v$ and each singular vertex $w$ there exists a directed path from $v$ to $w$	$C^*(E)$ is simple.
$E$ satisfies the following three properties: 1. Condition (L), 2. for each vertex $v$ in $E$ there is a path from $v$ to a cycle.	Every hereditary subalgebra of $C^*(E)$ contains an infinite projection. (When $C^*(E)$ is simple this is equivalent to $C^*(E)$ being purely infinite.)

== The gauge action ==
The universal property produces a natural action of the circle group $\mathbb{T} := \{ z \in \Complex : |z| = 1 \}$ on $C^*(E)$ as follows: If $\left\{ s_e, p_v : e \in E^1, v \in E^0 \right\}$ is a universal Cuntz-Krieger $E$-family, then for any unimodular complex number $z \in \mathbb{T}$, the collection $\left\{ zs_e, p_v : e \in E^1, v \in E^0 \right\}$ is a Cuntz-Krieger $E$-family, and the universal property of $C^*(E)$ implies there exists a $*$-homomorphism $\gamma_z : C^*(E) \to C^*(E)$ with $\gamma_z (s_e) = zs_e$ for all $e \in E^1$ and $\gamma_z(p_v) = p_v$ for all $v \in E^0$. For each $z \in \mathbb{T}$ the $*$-homomorphism $\gamma_\overline{z}$ is an inverse for $\gamma_z$, and thus $\gamma_z$ is an automorphism. This yields a strongly continuous action $\gamma: \mathbb{T} \to \operatorname{Aut} C^*(E)$ by defining $\gamma(z) := \gamma_z$. The gauge action $\gamma$ is sometimes called the canonical gauge action on $C^*(E)$. The canonical gauge action depends on the choice of the generating Cuntz-Krieger $E$-family $\left\{ s_e, p_v : e \in E^1, v \in E^0 \right\}$. The canonical gauge action is a fundamental tool in the study of $C^*(E)$. It appears in statements of theorems, and it is also used behind the scenes as a technical device in proofs.

== The uniqueness theorems ==
There are two well-known uniqueness theorems for graph C*-algebras: the gauge-invariant uniqueness theorem and the Cuntz-Krieger uniqueness theorem. The uniqueness theorems are fundamental results in the study of graph C*-algebras, and they serve as cornerstones of the theory. Each provides sufficient conditions for a $*$-homomorphism from $C^*(E)$ into a C*-algebra to be injective. Consequently, the uniqueness theorems can be used to determine when a C*-algebra generated by a Cuntz-Krieger $E$-family is isomorphic to $C^*(E)$; in particular, if $A$ is a C*-algebra generated by a Cuntz-Krieger $E$-family, the universal property of $C^*(E)$ produces a surjective $*$-homomorphism $\phi : C^*(E) \to A$, and the uniqueness theorems each give conditions under which $\phi$ is injective, and hence an isomorphism. Formal statements of the uniqueness theorems are as follows:

The Gauge-Invariant Uniqueness Theorem: Let $E$ be a graph, and let $C^*(E)$ be the associated graph C*-algebra. If $A$ is a C*-algebra and $\phi : C^*(E) \to A$ is a $*$-homomorphism satisfying the following two conditions:

1. there exists a gauge action $\beta : \mathbb{T} \to \operatorname{Aut} A$ such that $\phi \circ \beta_z = \gamma_z \circ \phi$ for all $z \in \mathbb{T}$, where $\gamma$ denotes the canonical gauge action on $C^*(E)$, and
2. $\phi(p_v) \neq 0$ for all $v \in E^0$,

then $\phi$ is injective.

The Cuntz-Krieger Uniqueness Theorem: Let $E$ be a graph satisfying Condition (L), and let $C^*(E)$ be the associated graph C*-algebra. If $A$ is a C*-algebra and $\phi : C^*(E) \to A$ is a $*$-homomorphism with $\phi(p_v) \neq 0$ for all $v \in E^0$, then $\phi$ is injective.

The gauge-invariant uniqueness theorem implies that if $\left\{ s_e, p_v : e \in E^1, v \in E^0 \right\}$ is a Cuntz-Krieger $E$-family with nonzero projections and there exists a gauge action $\beta$ with $\beta_z (p_v) = p_v$ and $\beta_z (s_e) = zs_e$ for all $v \in E^0$, $e \in E^1$, and $z \in \mathbb{T}$, then $\{ s_e, p_v : e \in E^1, v \in E^0 \}$ generates a C*-algebra isomorphic to $C^*(E)$. The Cuntz-Krieger uniqueness theorem shows that when the graph satisfies Condition (L) the existence of the gauge action is unnecessary; if a graph $E$ satisfies Condition (L), then any Cuntz-Krieger $E$-family with nonzero projections generates a C*-algebra isomorphic to $C^*(E)$.

== Ideal structure ==
The ideal structure of $C^*(E)$ can be determined from $E$. A subset of vertices $H \subseteq E^0$ is called hereditary if for all $e \in E^1$, $s(e) \in H$ implies $r(e) \in H$. A hereditary subset $H$ is called saturated if whenever $v$ is a regular vertex with $\{r(e): e \in E^0, s(e) = v\} \subseteq H$, then $v \in H$. The saturated hereditary subsets of $E$ are partially ordered by inclusion, and they form a lattice with meet $H_1 \wedge H_2 := H_1 \cap H_2$ and join $H_1 \vee H_2$ defined to be the smallest saturated hereditary subset containing $H_1 \cup H_2$.

If $H$ is a saturated hereditary subset, $I_H$ is defined to be closed two-sided ideal in $C^*(E)$ generated by $\{ p_v : v \in H \}$. A closed two-sided ideal $I$ of $C^*(E)$ is called gauge invariant if $\gamma_z(a) \in C^*(E)$ for all $a \in I$ and $z \in \mathbb{T}$. The gauge-invariant ideals are partially ordered by inclusion and form a lattice with meet $I_1 \wedge I_2 := I_1 \cap I_2$ and joint $I_1 \vee I_2$ defined to be the ideal generated by $I_1 \cup I_2$. For any saturated hereditary subset $H$, the ideal $I_H$ is gauge invariant.

The following theorem shows that gauge-invariant ideals correspond to saturated hereditary subsets.

Theorem: Let $E$ be a row-finite graph. Then the following hold:

1. The function $H \mapsto I_H$ is a lattice isomorphism from the lattice of saturated hereditary subsets of $E$ onto the lattice of gauge-invariant ideals of $C^*(E)$ with inverse given by $I \mapsto \left\{ v \in E^0 : p_v \in I \right\}$.
2. For any saturated hereditary subset $H$, the quotient $C^*(E)/I_H$ is $*$-isomorphic to $C^*(E \setminus H)$, where $E \setminus H$ is the subgraph of $E$ with vertex set $(E \setminus H)^0 := E^0 \setminus H$ and edge set $(E \setminus H)^1 := E^1 \setminus r^{-1}(H)$.
3. For any saturated hereditary subset $H$, the ideal $I_H$ is Morita equivalent to $C^*(E_H)$, where $E_H$ is the subgraph of $E$ with vertex set $E_H^0 := H$ and edge set $E_H^1 := s^{-1}(H)$.
4. If $E$ satisfies Condition (K), then every ideal of $C^*(E)$ is gauge invariant, and the ideals of $C^*(E)$ are in one-to-one correspondence with the saturated hereditary subsets of $E$.

== Desingularization ==
The Drinen-Tomforde Desingularization, often simply called desingularization, is a technique used to extend results for C*-algebras of row-finite graphs to C*-algebras of countable graphs. If $E$ is a graph, a desingularization of $E$ is a row-finite graph $F$ such that $C^*(E)$ is Morita equivalent to $C^*(F)$. Drinen and Tomforde described a method for constructing a desingularization from any countable graph: If $E$ is a countable graph, then for each vertex $v_0$ that emits an infinite number of edges, one first chooses a listing of the outgoing edges as $s^{-1}(v_0) = \{ e_0, e_1, e_2, \ldots \}$, one next attaches a tail of the form

to $E$ at $v_0$, and finally one erases the edges $e_0, e_1, e_2, \ldots$ from the graph and redistributes each along the tail by drawing a new edge $f_i$ from $v_i$ to $r(e_i)$ for each $i = 0, 1, 2, \ldots$.

Here are some examples of this construction. For the first example, note that if $E$ is the graph

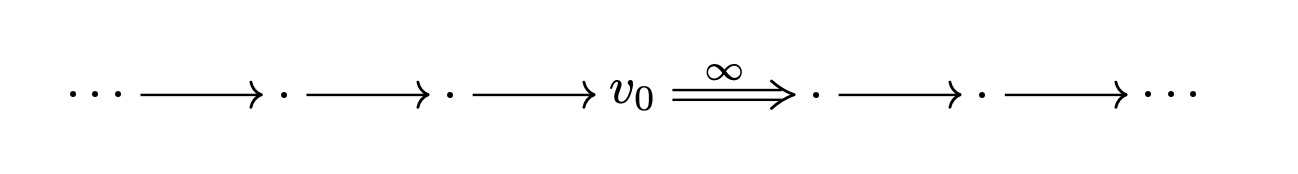

then a desingularization $F$ is given by the graph

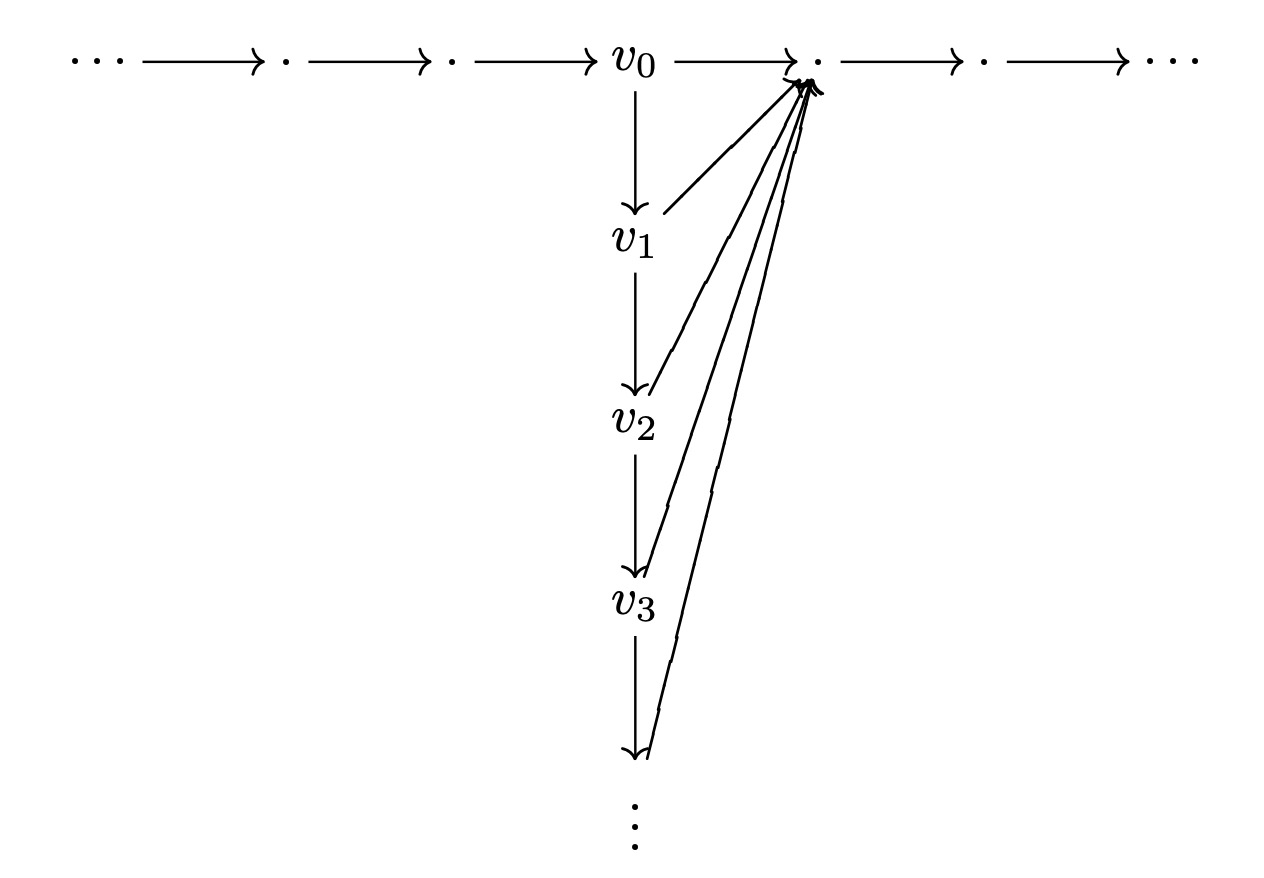

For the second example, suppose $E$ is the $\mathcal{O}_\infty$ graph with one vertex and a countably infinite number of edges (each beginning and ending at this vertex). Then a desingularization $F$ is given by the graph

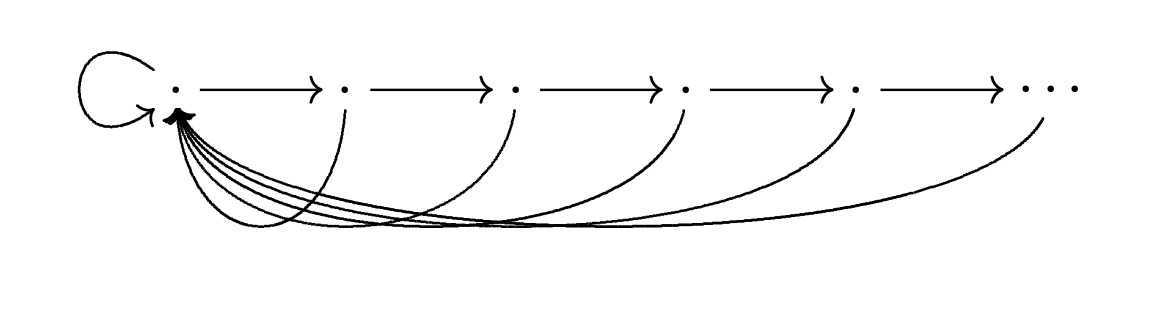

Desingularization has become a standard tool in the theory of graph C*-algebras, and it can simplify proofs of results by allowing one to first prove the result in the (typically much easier) row-finite case, and then extend the result to countable graphs via desingularization, often with little additional effort.

The technique of desingularization may not work for graphs containing a vertex that emits an uncountable number of edges. However, in the study of C*-algebras it is common to restrict attention to separable C*-algebras. Since a graph C*-algebra $C^*(E)$ is separable precisely when the graph $E$ is countable, much of the theory of graph C*-algebras has focused on countable graphs.

== K-theory ==
The K-groups of a graph C*-algebra may be computed entirely in terms of information coming from the graph. If $E$ is a row-finite graph, the vertex matrix of $E$ is the $E^0 \!\times\! E^0$ matrix $A_E$ with entry $A_E(v,w)$ defined to be the number of edges in $E$ from $v$ to $w$. Since $E$ is row-finite, $A_E$ has entries in $\mathbb{N} \cup \{ 0 \}$ and each row of $A_E$ has only finitely many nonzero entries. (In fact, this is where the term "row-finite" comes from.) Consequently, each column of the transpose $A_E^t$ contains only finitely many nonzero entries, and we obtain a map $A_E^t : \bigoplus_{E^0} \mathbb{Z} \to \bigoplus_{E^0} \mathbb{Z}$ given by left multiplication. Likewise, if $I$ denotes the $E^0 \!\times\! E^0$ identity matrix, then $I - A_E^t : \bigoplus_{E^0} \mathbb{Z} \to \bigoplus_{E^0} \mathbb{Z}$ provides a map given by left multiplication.

Theorem: Let $E$ be a row-finite graph with no sinks, and let $A_E$ denote the vertex matrix of $E$. Then
$$I - A_E^t : \bigoplus_{E^0} \mathbb{Z} \to \bigoplus_{E^0} \mathbb{Z}$$
gives a well-defined map by left multiplication. Furthermore,
$$K_0(C^*(E)) \cong \operatorname{coker} (I- A_E^t) \quad\text{ and }\quad K_1(C^*(E)) \cong \ker (I - A_E^t).$$
In addition, if $C^*(E)$ is unital (or, equivalently, $E^0$ is finite), then the isomorphism $K_0(C^*(E)) \cong \operatorname{coker} (I- A_E^t)$ takes the class of the unit in $K_0(C^*(E))$ to the class of the vector $(1, 1, \ldots, 1)$ in $\operatorname{coker} (I- A_E^t)$.

Since $K_1(C^*(E))$ is isomorphic to a subgroup of the free group $\bigoplus_{E^0} \mathbb{Z}$, we may conclude that $K_1(C^*(E))$ is a free group. It can be shown that in the general case (i.e., when $E$ is allowed to contain sinks or infinite emitters) that $K_1(C^*(E))$ remains a free group. This allows one to produce examples of C*-algebras that are not graph C*-algebras: Any C*-algebra with a non-free K_{1}-group is not Morita equivalent (and hence not isomorphic) to a graph C*-algebra.

== See also ==
- k-graph C*-algebra
- Leavitt path algebra
