= Filter quantifier =

In mathematics, a filter on a set $X$ informally gives a notion of which subsets $A \subseteq X$ are "large". Filter quantifiers are a type of logical quantifier which, informally, say whether or not a statement is true for "most" elements of $X.$ Such quantifiers are often used in combinatorics, model theory (such as when dealing with ultraproducts), and in other fields of mathematical logic where (ultra)filters are used.

== Background ==
Here we will use the set theory convention, where a filter $\mathcal{F}$ on a set $X$ is defined to be an order-theoretic proper filter in the poset $(\mathcal{P}(X), \subseteq),$ that is, a subset of $\mathcal{P}(X)$ such that:

- $\varnothing \notin \mathcal{F}$ and $X \in \mathcal{F}$;
- For all $A, B \in \mathcal{F},$ we have $A \cap B \in \mathcal{F}$;
- For all $A \subseteq B \subseteq X,$ if $A \in \mathcal{F}$ then $B \in \mathcal{F}.$

Recall a filter $\mathcal{F}$ on $X$ is an ultrafilter if, for every $A \subseteq X,$ either $A \in \mathcal{F}$ or $X \setminus A \in \mathcal{F}.$

Given a filter $\mathcal{F}$ on a set $X,$ we say a subset $A \subseteq X$ is $\mathcal{F}$-stationary if, for all $B \in \mathcal{F},$ we have $A \cap B \neq \varnothing.$

== Definition ==
Let $\mathcal{F}$ be a filter on a set $X.$ We define the filter quantifiers $\forall_\mathcal{F} x$ and $\exists_\mathcal{F} x$ as formal logical symbols with the following interpretation:

$$\forall_\mathcal{F} x\ \varphi(x) \iff \{ x \in X: \varphi(x) \} \in \mathcal{F}$$

$\exists_\mathcal{F} x\ \varphi(x) \iff \{ x \in X: \varphi(x) \}$ is $\mathcal{F}$-stationary

for every first-order formula $\varphi(x)$ with one free variable. These also admit alternative definitions as

$$\forall_\mathcal{F} x\ \varphi(x) \iff \exists A \in \mathcal{F}\ \ \forall x \in A\ \ \varphi(x)$$

$$\exists_\mathcal{F} x\ \varphi(x) \iff \forall A \in \mathcal{F}\ \ \exists x \in A\ \ \varphi(x)$$

When $\mathcal{F}$ is an ultrafilter, the two quantifiers defined above coincide, and we will often use the notation $\mathcal{F} x$ instead. Verbally, we might pronounce $\mathcal{F} x$ as "for $\mathcal{F}$-almost all $x$", "for $\mathcal{F}$-most $x$", "for the majority of $x$ (according to $\mathcal{F}$)", or "for most $x$ (according to $\mathcal{F}$)". In cases where the filter is clear, we might omit mention of $\mathcal{F}.$

== Properties ==
The filter quantifiers $\forall_\mathcal{F} x$ and $\exists_\mathcal{F} x$ satisfy the following logical identities, for all formulae $\varphi, \psi$:

- Duality: $\forall_\mathcal{F} x\ \varphi(x) \iff \neg \exists_\mathcal{F} x\ \neg \varphi(x)$
- Weakening: $\forall x\ \varphi(x) \implies \forall_\mathcal{F} x\ \varphi(x) \implies \exists_\mathcal{F} x\ \varphi(x) \implies \exists x\ \varphi(x)$
- Conjunction:
  - $\forall_\mathcal{F} x\ \big( \varphi(x) \land \psi(x) \big) \iff \big( \forall_\mathcal{F} x\ \varphi(x) \big) \land \big( \forall_\mathcal{F} x\ \psi(x) \big)$
  - $\exists_\mathcal{F} x\ \big( \varphi(x) \land \psi(x) \big) \implies \big( \exists_\mathcal{F} x\ \varphi(x) \big) \land \big( \exists_\mathcal{F} x\ \psi(x) \big)$
- Disjunction:
  - $\forall_\mathcal{F} x\ \big( \varphi(x) \lor \psi(x) \big) \;\Longleftarrow\; \big( \forall_\mathcal{F} x\ \varphi(x) \big) \lor \big( \forall_\mathcal{F} x\ \psi(x) \big)$
  - $\exists_\mathcal{F} x\ \big( \varphi(x) \lor \psi(x) \big) \;\Longleftrightarrow\; \big( \exists_\mathcal{F} x\ \varphi(x) \big) \lor \big( \exists_\mathcal{F} x\ \psi(x) \big)$
- If $\mathcal{F} \subseteq \mathcal{G}$ are filters on $X,$ then:
  - $\forall_\mathcal{F} x\ \varphi(x) \implies \forall_\mathcal{G} x\ \varphi(x)$
  - $\exists_\mathcal{F} x\ \varphi(x) \;\Longleftarrow\; \exists_\mathcal{G} x\ \varphi(x)$

Additionally, if $\mathcal{F}$ is an ultrafilter, the two filter quantifiers coincide: $\forall_\mathcal{F} x\ \varphi(x) \iff \exists_\mathcal{F} x\ \varphi(x).$ Renaming this quantifier $\mathcal{F} x,$ the following properties hold:

- Negation: $\mathcal{F} x\ \varphi(x) \iff \neg \mathcal{F} x\ \neg \varphi(x)$
- Weakening: $\forall x\ \varphi(x) \implies \mathcal{F} x\ \varphi(x) \implies \exists x\ \varphi(x)$
- Conjunction: $\mathcal{F} x\ \big( \varphi(x) \land \psi(x) \big) \iff \big( \mathcal{F} x\ \varphi(x) \big) \land \big( \mathcal{F} x\ \psi(x) \big)$
- Disjunction: $\mathcal{F} x\ \big( \varphi(x) \lor \psi(x) \big) \iff \big( \mathcal{F} x\ \varphi(x) \big) \lor \big( \mathcal{F} x\ \psi(x) \big)$

In general, filter quantifiers do not commute with each other, nor with the usual $\forall$ and $\exists$ quantifiers.

== Examples ==
- If $\mathcal{F} = \{X\}$ is the trivial filter on $X,$ then unpacking the definition, we have $\forall_\mathcal{F} x\ \varphi(x) \iff \{x \in X: \varphi(x)\} = X,$ and $\exists_\mathcal{F} x\ \varphi(x) \iff \{x \in X: \varphi(x)\} \cap X \neq \varnothing.$ This recovers the usual $\forall$ and $\exists$ quantifiers.
- Let $\mathcal{F}^\infty$ be the Fréchet filter on an infinite set $X,$ Then, $\forall_{\mathcal{F}^\infty} x\ \varphi(x)$ holds iff $\varphi(x)$ holds for cofinitely many $x \in X,$ and $\exists_{\mathcal{F}^\infty} x\ \varphi(x)$ holds iff $\varphi(x)$ holds for infinitely many $x \in X.$ The quantifiers $\forall_{\mathcal{F}^\infty}$ and $\exists_{\mathcal{F}^\infty}$ are more commonly denoted $\forall^\infty$ and $\exists^\infty,$ respectively.
- Let $\mathcal{M}$ be the "measure filter" on $[0, 1],$ generated by all subsets $A \subseteq [0,1]$ with Lebesgue measure $\mu(A) = 1.$ The above construction gives us "measure quantifiers": $\forall_\mathcal{M} x\ \varphi(x)$ holds iff $\varphi(x)$ holds almost everywhere, and $\exists_\mathcal{M} x\ \varphi(x)$ holds iff $\varphi(x)$ holds on a set of positive measure.
- Suppose $\mathcal{F}_A$ is the principal filter on some set $A \subseteq X.$ Then, we have $\forall_{\mathcal{F}_A} x\ \varphi(x) \iff \forall x \in A\ \varphi(x),$ and $\exists_{\mathcal{F}_A} x\ \varphi(x) \iff \exists x \in A\ \varphi(x).$
  - If $\mathcal{U}_d$ is the principal ultrafilter of an element $d \in X,$ then we have $\mathcal{U}_d\, x\ \varphi(x) \iff \varphi(d).$

== Use ==
The utility of filter quantifiers is that they often give a more concise or clear way to express certain mathematical ideas. For example, take the definition of convergence of a real-valued sequence: a sequence $(a_n)_{n \in \N} \subseteq \R$ converges to a point $a \in \R$ if

$$\forall \varepsilon > 0\ \ \exists N \in \mathbb{N}\ \ \forall n \in \N\ \big(\ n \geq N \implies \vert a_n - a \vert < \varepsilon\ \big)$$

Using the Fréchet quantifier $\forall^\infty$ as defined above, we can give a nicer (equivalent) definition:

$$\forall \varepsilon > 0\ \ \forall^\infty n \in \mathbb{N}:\ \vert a_n - a \vert < \varepsilon$$

Filter quantifiers are especially useful in constructions involving filters. As an example, suppose that $X$ has a binary operation $+$ defined on it. There is a natural way to extend $+$ to $\beta X,$ the set of ultrafilters on $X$:

$$\mathcal{U} \oplus \mathcal{V} = \big\{ A \subseteq X :\ \mathcal{U}x\ \mathcal{V}y\ \ x+y \in A \big\}$$

With an understanding of the ultrafilter quantifier, this definition is reasonably intuitive. It says that $\mathcal{U} \oplus \mathcal{V}$ is the collection of subsets $A \subseteq X$ such that, for most $x$ (according to $\mathcal{U}$) and for most $y$ (according to $\mathcal{V}$), the sum $x+y$ is in $A.$ Compare this to the equivalent definition without ultrafilter quantifiers:

$$\mathcal{U} \oplus \mathcal{V} = \big\{ A \subseteq X :\ \{ x \in X:\ \{ y \in X:\ x+y \in A \} \in \mathcal{V} \} \in \mathcal{U} \big\}$$

The meaning of this is much less clear.

This increased intuition is also evident in proofs involving ultrafilters. For example, if $+$ is associative on $X,$ using the first definition of $\oplus,$ it trivially follows that $\oplus$ is associative on $\beta X.$ Proving this using the second definition takes a lot more work.

== See also ==
- Filter (mathematics) – Special subset of a partially ordered set
- Filter on a set – Family of sets representing "large" sets
- Generalized quantifier – Expression denoting a set of sets in formal semantics
- Stone–Čech compactification – Concept in topology
- Ultrafilter – Maximal proper filter
- Ultrafilter on a set – Maximal proper filter
