= Tube lemma =

Lemma in topology

In mathematics, particularly topology, the tube lemma, also called Wallace's theorem, is a useful tool in order to prove that the product of finitely many compact spaces is compact.

== Statement ==
The lemma uses the following terminology:

- If $X$ and $Y$ are topological spaces and $X \times Y$ is the product space, endowed with the product topology, a slice in $X \times Y$ is a set of the form $\{ x \} \times Y$ for $x \in X$.
- A tube in $X \times Y$ is a subset of the form $U\times Y$ where $U$ is an open subset of $X$. It contains all the slices $\{x\} \times Y$ for $x \in U$.

Tube Lemma—Let $X$ and $Y$ be topological spaces with $Y$ compact, and consider the product space $X \times Y.$ If $N$ is an open set containing a slice in $X \times Y,$ then there exists a tube in $X \times Y$ containing this slice and contained in $N.$

Using the concept of closed maps, this can be rephrased concisely as follows: if $X$ is any topological space and $Y$ a compact space, then the projection map $X \times Y \to X$ is closed.

Generalized Tube Lemma 1—Let $X$ and $Y$ be topological spaces and consider the product space $X \times Y.$ Let $A$ be a compact subset of $X$ and $B$ be a compact subset of $Y.$ If $N$ is an open set containing $A \times B,$ then there exists $U$ open in $X$ and $V$ open in $Y$ such that $A \times B \subseteq U \times V \subseteq N.$

Generalized Tube Lemma 2—Let $X_i, i\in I$ be topological spaces and consider the product space $\prod_{i\in I} X_i.$ For each $i\in I$, let $A_i$ be a compact subset of $X_i.$ If $N$ is an open set containing $\prod_{i\in I} A_i,$ then there exists $U_i$ open in $X_i$ with $U_i = X_i$ for all but finite amount of $i\in I$, such that $\prod_{i\in I} A_i \subseteq \prod_{i\in I} U_i \subseteq N.$

== Examples and properties ==
1. Consider $\mathbb{R} \times \mathbb{R}$ in the product topology, that is the Euclidean plane, and the open set $N = \{ (x, y) \in \mathbb{R} \times \mathbb{R} ~:~ |xy| < 1 \}.$ The open set $N$ contains $\{ 0 \} \times \mathbb{R},$ but contains no tube, so in this case the tube lemma fails. Indeed, if $W \times \mathbb{R}$ is a tube containing $\{ 0 \} \times \mathbb{R}$ and contained in $N,$ $W$ must be a subset of $\left( - 1/x, 1/x \right)$ for all $x>0$ which means $W = \{ 0 \}$ contradicting the fact that $W$ is open in $\mathbb{R}$ (because $W \times \mathbb{R}$ is a tube). This shows that the compactness assumption is essential.

2. The tube lemma can be used to prove that if $X$ and $Y$ are compact spaces, then $X \times Y$ is compact as follows:

Let $\{ G_a \}$ be an open cover of $X \times Y$. For each $x \in X$, cover the slice $\{ x \} \times Y$ by finitely many elements of $\{ G_a \}$ (this is possible since $\{ x \} \times Y$ is compact, being homeomorphic to $Y$). Call the union of these finitely many elements $N_x.$ By the tube lemma, there is an open set of the form $W_x \times Y$ containing $\{ x \} \times Y$ and contained in $N_x.$ The collection of all $W_x$ for $x \in X$ is an open cover of $X$ and hence has a finite subcover $\{W_{x_1},\dots,W_{x_n}\}$. Thus the finite collection $\{W_{x_1}\times Y,\dots,W_{x_n}\times Y\}$ covers $X\times Y$. Using the fact that each $W_{x_i} \times Y$ is contained in $N_{x_i}$ and each $N_{x_i}$ is the finite union of elements of $\{G_a\}$, one gets a finite subcollection of $\{G_a\}$ that covers $X \times Y$.

3. By part 2 and induction, one can show that the finite product of compact spaces is compact.

4. The tube lemma cannot be used to prove the Tychonoff theorem, which generalizes the above to infinite products.

== Proof ==
The tube lemma follows from the generalized tube lemma by taking $A = \{ x \}$ and $B = Y.$ It therefore suffices to prove the generalized tube lemma. By the definition of the product topology, for each $(a, b) \in A \times B$ there are open sets $U_{a, b} \subseteq X$ and $V_{a, b} \subseteq Y$ such that $(a, b) \in U_{a, b} \times V_{a, b} \subseteq N.$ For any $a \in A,$ $\left\{ V_{a,b} ~:~ b \in B \right\}$ is an open cover of the compact set $B$ so this cover has a finite subcover; namely, there is a finite set $B_0(a) \subseteq B$ such that $V_{a} := \bigcup_{b \in B_0(a)} V_{a,b}$ contains $B,$ where $V_a$ is open in $Y.$ For every $a \in A,$ let $U_a := \bigcap_{b \in B_0(a)} U_{a,b},$ which is an open set in $X$ since $B_0(a)$ is finite. Moreover, the construction of $U_a$ and $V_a$ implies that $\{ a \} \times B \subseteq U_a \times V_a \subseteq N.$ We now essentially repeat the argument to drop the dependence on $a.$ Let $A_0 \subseteq A$ be a finite subset such that $U := \bigcup_{a \in A_0} U_a$ contains $A$ and set $V := \bigcap_{a \in A_0} V_a.$ It then follows by the above reasoning that $A \times B \subseteq U \times V \subseteq N$, and $U \subseteq X$ and $V \subseteq Y$ are respectively open, which completes the proof.

== See also ==
- Alexander's sub-base theorem – Collection of subsets that generate a topology
- Tubular neighborhood – Neighborhood of a submanifold
- Tychonoff theorem – Product of any collection of compact topological spaces is compact
