= Subbase =

Collection of subsets that generate a topology

In topology in mathematics, a subbase (or subbasis, prebase, prebasis) for the topology τ of a topological space (X, τ) is a subcollection $B$ of $\tau$ that generates $\tau,$ in the sense that $\tau$ is the smallest topology containing $B$ as open sets. A slightly different definition is used by some authors, and there are other useful equivalent formulations of the definition; these are discussed below.

Subbase is a weaker notion than that of a base for a topology.

== Definition ==
Let $X$ be a topological space with topology $\tau.$ A subbase of $\tau$ is usually defined as a subcollection $B$ of $\tau$ satisfying one of the three following equivalent conditions:

1. $\tau$ is the smallest topology containing $B$: any topology $\tau^\prime$ on $X$ containing $B$ must also contain $\tau.$
2. $\tau$ is the intersection of all topologies on $X$ containing $B.$
3. The collection of open sets consisting of $X$ and all finite intersections of elements of $B$ forms a basis for $\tau.$ (Note: Rudin's definition is less general than ours, because it effectively requires that $B$ covers $X$ (see "Alternative definition" subsection below). We drop this requirement here, and assume that $B$ is any subset of $\mathcal{P}(X)$) This means that every proper open set in $\tau$ can be written as a union of finite intersections of elements of $B.$ Explicitly, given a point $x$ in an open set $U \subsetneq X,$ there are finitely many sets $S_1, \ldots, S_n$ of $B,$ such that the intersection of these sets contains $x$ and is contained in $U.$

If we additionally assume that $B$ covers $X$, or if we use the nullary intersection convention, then there is no need to include $X$ in the third definition.

If $B$ is a subbase of $\tau$, we say that $B$ generates the topology $\tau.$ This terminology originates from the explicit construction of $\tau$ from $B$ using the second or third definition above.

Elements of subbase are called subbasic (open) sets. A cover composed of subbasic sets is called a subbasic (open) cover.

For any subcollection $S$ of the power set $\wp(X),$ there is a unique topology having $S$ as a subbase; it is the intersection of all topologies on $X$ containing $S$. In general, however, the converse is not true, i.e. there is no unique subbasis for a given topology.

Thus, we can start with a fixed topology and find subbases for that topology, and we can also start with an arbitrary subcollection of the power set $\wp(X)$ and form the topology generated by that subcollection. We can freely use either equivalent definition above; indeed, in many cases, one of the three conditions is more useful than the others.

=== Alternative definition ===
Less commonly, a slightly different definition of subbase is given which requires that the subbase $\mathcal{B}$ cover $X.$ In this case, $X$ is the union of all sets contained in $\mathcal{B}.$ This means that there can be no confusion regarding the use of nullary intersections in the definition.

However, this definition is not always equivalent to the three definitions above. There exist topological spaces $(X, \tau)$ with subcollections $\mathcal{B} \subseteq \tau$ of the topology such that $\tau$ is the smallest topology containing $\mathcal{B}$, yet $\mathcal{B}$ does not cover $X$. For example, consider a topological space $(X,\tau)$ with $\tau=\{\varnothing, \{p\}, X\}$ and $\mathcal{B}=\{\{p\}\}$ for some $p\in X.$ Clearly, $\mathcal{B}$ is a subbase of $\tau$, yet $\mathcal{B}$ doesn't cover $X$ as long as $X$ has at least $2$ elements. In practice, this is a rare occurrence. E.g. a subbase of a space that has at least two points and satisfies the T_{1} separation axiom must be a cover of that space.

== Examples ==
The topology generated by any subset $\mathcal{S} \subseteq \{\varnothing, X\}$ (including by the empty set $\mathcal{S} := \varnothing$) is equal to the trivial topology $\{\varnothing, X\}.$

If $\tau$ is a topology on $X$ and $\mathcal{B}$ is a basis for $\tau$ then the topology generated by $\mathcal{B}$ is $\tau.$ Thus any basis $\mathcal{B}$ for a topology $\tau$ is also a subbasis for $\tau.$ If $\mathcal{S}$ is any subset of $\tau$ then the topology generated by $\mathcal{S}$ will be a subset of $\tau.$

The usual topology on the real numbers $\R$ has a subbase consisting of all semi-infinite open intervals either of the form $(-\infty, a)$ or $(b, \infty),$ where $a$ and $b$ are real numbers. Together, these generate the usual topology, since the intersections $(a,b) = (-\infty, b) \cap (a, \infty)$ for $a \leq b$ generate the usual topology. A second subbase is formed by taking the subfamily where $a$ and $b$ are rational. The second subbase generates the usual topology as well, since the open intervals $(a, b)$ with $a,$ $b$ rational, are a basis for the usual Euclidean topology.

The subbase consisting of all semi-infinite open intervals of the form $(-\infty, a)$ alone, where $a$ is a real number, does not generate the usual topology. The resulting topology does not satisfy the T_{1} separation axiom, since if $a < b$ every open set containing $b$ also contains $a.$

The initial topology on $X$ defined by a family of functions $f_i : X \to Y_i,$ where each $Y_i$ has a topology, is the coarsest topology on $X$ such that each $f_i$ is continuous. Because continuity can be defined in terms of the inverse images of open sets, this means that the initial topology on $X$ is given by taking all $f_i^{-1}(U),$ where $U$ ranges over all open subsets of $Y_i,$ as a subbasis.

Two important special cases of the initial topology are the product topology, where the family of functions is the set of projections from the product to each factor, and the subspace topology, where the family consists of just one function, the inclusion map.

The compact-open topology on the space of continuous functions from $X$ to $Y$ has for a subbase the set of functions
$$V(K,U) = \{f : X \to Y \mid f(K) \subseteq U\}$$
where $K \subseteq X$ is compact and $U$ is an open subset of $Y.$

Suppose that $(X, \tau)$ is a Hausdorff topological space with $X$ containing two or more elements (for example, $X = \R$ with the Euclidean topology). Let $Y \in \tau$ be any non-empty open subset of $(X, \tau)$ (for example, $Y$ could be a non-empty bounded open interval in $\R$) and let $\nu$ denote the subspace topology on $Y$ that $Y$ inherits from $(X, \tau)$ (so $\nu \subseteq \tau$). Then the topology generated by $\nu$ on $X$ is equal to the union $\{X\} \cup \nu$ (see the footnote for an explanation), (Note: Since $\nu$ is a topology on $Y$ and $Y$ is an open subset of $(X, \tau),$, it is easy to verify that $\{X\} \cup \nu$ is a topology on $X$. In particular, $\nu$ is closed under unions and finite intersections because $\tau$ is. But since $X \not\in \nu$, $\nu$ is not a topology on $X$ an $\{X\} \cup \nu$ is clearly the smallest topology on $X$ containing $\nu$).) where $\{X\} \cup \nu \subseteq \tau$ (since $(X, \tau)$ is Hausdorff, equality will hold if and only if $Y = X$). Note that if $Y$ is a proper subset of $X,$ then $\{X\} \cup \nu$ is the smallest topology on $X$ containing $\nu$ yet $\nu$ does not cover $X$ (that is, the union $\bigcup_{V \in \nu} V = Y$ is a proper subset of $X$).

== Results using subbases ==
One nice fact about subbases is that continuity of a function need only be checked on a subbase of the range. That is, if $f : X \to Y$ is a map between topological spaces and if $\mathcal{B}$ is a subbase for $Y,$ then $f : X \to Y$ is continuous if and only if $f^{-1}(B)$ is open in $X$ for every $B \in \mathcal{B}.$ A net (or sequence) $x_{\bull} = \left(x_i\right)_{i \in I}$ converges to a point $x$ if and only if every subbasic neighborhood of $x$ contains all $x_i$ for sufficiently large $i \in I.$

=== Alexander subbase theorem ===
The Alexander Subbase Theorem is a significant result concerning subbases that is due to James Waddell Alexander II. The corresponding result for basic (rather than subbasic) open covers is much easier to prove.

Alexander subbase theorem: Let $(X, \tau)$ be a topological space, and $\mathcal{S}$ be a subbase of $\tau.$ If every cover of $X$ by elements from $\mathcal{S}$ has a finite subcover, then $X$ is compact.

The converse to this theorem also holds (because every cover of $X$ by elements of $\mathcal{S}$ is an open cover of $X$)

Let $(X, \tau)$ be a topological space, and $\mathcal{S}$ be a subbase of $\tau.$ If $X$ is compact, then every cover of $X$ by elements from $\mathcal{S}$ has a finite subcover.

Although this proof makes use of Zorn's Lemma, the proof does not need the full strength of choice. Instead, it relies on the intermediate Ultrafilter principle.

Using this theorem with the subbase for $\R$ above, one can give a very easy proof that bounded closed intervals in $\R$ are compact. More generally, Tychonoff's theorem, which states that the product of non-empty compact spaces is compact, has a short proof if the Alexander Subbase Theorem is used.

== See also ==
- Base (topology) – Collection of open sets used to define a topology
