= Tychonoff's theorem =

Product of any collection of compact topological spaces is compact

In mathematics, Tychonoff's theorem states that the product of any collection of compact topological spaces is compact with respect to the product topology. The theorem is named after Andrey Nikolayevich Tikhonov (whose surname sometimes is transcribed Tychonoff), who proved it first in 1930 for powers of the closed unit interval and in 1935 stated the full theorem along with the remark that its proof was the same as for the special case. The earliest known published proof is contained in a 1935 article by Tychonoff, "Über einen Funktionenraum".

Tychonoff's theorem is one of the most foundational results in general topology. The theorem is also valid for topological spaces based on fuzzy sets.

== Statement ==
Here is the statement of the theorem.

Tychonoff's theorem—Let $X_i, \, i \in I$ be a family of compact spaces. Then their product

$$X := \prod_{i \in I} X_i$$

is a compact space with respect to the product topology (meaning the initial topology with respect to the projections $p_i : X \to X_i$).

=== Strength ===
The above theorem turns out to be equivalent to the axiom of choice. There is a special case of the theorem saying

- A product of compact Hausdorff spaces $X_i$ is compact Hausdorff. If, in addition, all the $X_i$ are nonempty, then the product $\prod X_i$ is nonempty.

This Hausdorff version of the theorem is actually strictly weaker than the axiom of choice and is equivalent to the Boolean prime ideal theorem. (Note for an arbitrary product, the axiom of choice ensures the product is nonempty when each factor is nonempty. But in the Hausdorff case, the above version can ensure the nonempty-ness without Choice. In fact, it implies a version of the axiom of choice; see § Application: the Hahn–Banach theorem.)

For a finite product of compact sets, the theorem is rather trivial (see § Tychonoff's theorem for finite products below) and does not depend on the axiom of choice or weaker variants.

== Tychonoff's theorem for finite products ==
For a finite product of compact spaces, the theorem is substantially easier. For example, it would follow from

- if $X$ is a compact space and $Y$ is any topological space, then the projection $p : X \times Y \to Y$ is proper; i.e., the pre-image of a compact set is compact.

Alternatively, the tube lemma can be used to give a direct proof; see Tube lemma § Examples and properties.

=== Further remark ===
For a metric space, compactness is equivalent to sequential compactness. Using Cantor's diagonal argument, it is straightforward to show a countable product of sequentially compact spaces is sequentially compact space; thus, for metric spaces at least, this gives the theorem for a countable product.

However, for many applications, taking uncountable products is necessary. For example, taking $L = C(X, I)$ to be the set of all continuous maps from a topological space $X$ to the unit interval $I = [0, 1]$, we have the natural map

$$X \to \prod_L I, \, x \mapsto (f(x) \mid f).$$

The closure of the image is exactly the Stone–Čech compactification $\beta X$ of the space $X$; here, the compactness of $\beta X$ is a consequence of Tychonoff's theorem.

== Applications ==
Tychonoff's theorem has been used to prove many other mathematical theorems. These include theorems about compactness of certain spaces such as the Banach–Alaoglu theorem on the weak-* compactness of the unit ball of the dual space of a normed vector space, and the Arzelà–Ascoli theorem characterizing the sequences of functions in which every subsequence has a uniformly convergent subsequence. They also include statements less obviously related to compactness, such as the De Bruijn–Erdős theorem stating that every minimal k-chromatic graph is finite, and the Curtis–Hedlund–Lyndon theorem providing a topological characterization of cellular automata.

As a rule of thumb, any sort of construction that takes as input a fairly general object (often of an algebraic, or topological-algebraic nature) and outputs a compact space is likely to use Tychonoff: e.g., the Gelfand space of maximal ideals of a commutative C*-algebra, the Stone space of maximal ideals of a Boolean algebra, and the Berkovich spectrum of a commutative Banach ring.

In logic, specifically model theory, Tychonoff’s theorem implies the compactness theorem, which says a theory (a set of sentences) has a model if and only if each finite subset of it does.

== Proofs ==
1) Tychonoff's 1930 proof used the concept of a complete accumulation point.

2) The theorem is a quick corollary of the Alexander subbase theorem.

3) The theory of convergence via filters, due to Henri Cartan and developed by Bourbaki, leads to the following criterion: assuming the ultrafilter lemma, a space is compact if and only if each ultrafilter on the space converges. With this in hand, the proof becomes easy: the (filter generated by the) image of an ultrafilter on the product space under any projection map is an ultrafilter on the factor space, which therefore converges, to at least one x_{i}. One then shows that the original ultrafilter converges to x = (x_{i}). See Filters in topology § Tychonoff's theorem for the ingredients used here.

In the above proof, the axiom of choice is used twice: (1) to construct ultrafilters to characterize compactness and (2) to pick limit points $x_i$. Conversely, Tychonoff's theorem implies the axiom of choice; see § Proof of the axiom of choice from Tychonoff's theorem below. Thus, the use of the axiom of choice in the proof is unavoidable in general. However, if each factor $X_i$ is Hausdorff, each limit point $x_i$ is unique and so the second use of Choice is unnecessary. Ultrafilters, on the other hand, can be constructed by the Boolean prime ideal theorem or BPI (in the form of ultrafilter lemma) and, conversely, the Hausdorff version of the theorem implies BPI; see the remark at the end of § Application: the Hahn–Banach theorem. (Studying the strength of Tychonoff's theorem for various restricted classes of spaces is a topic in set-theoretic topology.)

3)' Adapting the above proof, it is also possible to give a proof directly from Zorn's lemma; see Zorn's lemma § A proof of Tychonoff's theorem. (For example, in his textbook, Munkres gives such a proof.)

4) Similarly, the Moore–Smith theory of convergence via nets, as supplemented by Kelley's notion of a universal net, leads to the criterion that a space is compact if and only if each universal net on the space converges. This criterion leads to a proof of Tychonoff's theorem, which is, word for word, identical to the Cartan/Bourbaki proof using filters, save for the repeated substitution of "universal net" for "ultrafilter". A proof using nets but not universal nets was given in 1992 by Paul Chernoff; see just below.

5) For compact Hausdorff spaces, the theorem (a product of compact Hausdorff spaces is compact Hausdorff) can be deduced from a corresponding result for locales: namely, a product of compact locales is compact.

=== Proof using nets ===
A proof here, due to P. Chernoff, is based on the following characterization of compactness in terms of nets:

- A space is compact if and only if each net on it has a cluster point.

Given a family of compact sets $X_a$ indexed by a set $A$, to show

$$\prod_{a \in A} X_a$$

is compact, we can therefore show each net $\langle x_{\alpha} \mid \alpha \in I \rangle$ on it has a cluster point.

We shall identity the product $\prod_{a \in A} X_a$ as the set of all maps $f : A \to \cup_{a \in A} X_a$ such that $f(a) \in X_a$; in fact, this is the usual definition of a set-theoretic product. Then finding a required cluster point amounts to constructing such a map with the required property. For that, consider the set

$$E := \{ f : B \to Y \mid B \subset A, f(b) \in X_b, \, f \, \text{ a cluster point of } \, {x_i}|_B \}$$

where $Y = \cup_{a \in A} X_a$. We give this set the ordering by restriction; i.e., $f \le g$ if and only if $f$ is the restriction of $g$.

We now claim the hypothesis of Zorn's lemma is satisfied. For that, let $f_i : B_i \to Y$ be a chain in the above $E$ and define $f : B \to Y$ by $B = \cup_i B_i$ and $f|_{B_i} = f_i$. To show $f$ is a cluster point of ${x_i}|_B$, let $U$ be a basic neighborhood of $f$ in $\prod_{a \in B} X_a.$ By definition, it can be written as $U = \prod_{c \in C} U_c \times \prod_{b \in B - C} X_b$ for some finite subset $C \subset B$ and open subsets $U_c \subset X_c$. Now, since $C$ is finite, $C \subset B_i$ for large enough $i$. And since $f|_{B_i}$ is a cluster point of the net $x_{\alpha}|_{B_i}$, for each $\alpha \in I$, we can find a $\beta \ge \alpha$ such that $x_{\beta}|_{B_i} \in \prod_{c \in C} U_c \times \prod_{b \in B_i - C} X_b$ and thus $x_{\beta}|_{B} \in U$ as required.

Hence, by Zorn's lemma, we can find a maximal element $f : B \to Y$ in $E$. We shall show $B = A$. Suppose otherwise; then there is an element $a \in A - B$. Now, $f|_{B}$ is a cluster point of $\langle x_{\alpha}|_B \mid \alpha \in I \rangle$ and so we can find a subnet $x' : J \to I \overset{x}\to \prod X_a$ of the net $x$ such that $x'_{\alpha}|_{B}$ converges to $f|_B$. Since $X_a$ is compact, $x'_{\alpha}|_{\{a\}}$ has a cluster point, and so similarly we can find a subnet $x''$ of $x'$ that converges on $\{ a \}$, to some point of $X_a$. Thus, we can extend $f$ to $g$ that is a limit of $x''|_{B \cup \{a\}}$, a contradiction to the maximality of $f$. $\square$

=== Proof of the axiom of choice from Tychonoff's theorem ===
To prove that Tychonoff's theorem in its general version implies the axiom of choice, we establish that every infinite cartesian product of non-empty sets is nonempty. The trickiest part of the proof is introducing the right topology. The right topology, as it turns out, is the cofinite topology with a small twist. It turns out that every set given this topology automatically becomes a compact space. Once we have this fact, Tychonoff's theorem can be applied; we then use the finite intersection property (FIP) definition of compactness. The proof itself (due to J. L. Kelley) follows:

Let {A_{i}} be an indexed family of nonempty sets, for i ranging in I (where I is an arbitrary indexing set). We wish to show that the cartesian product of these sets is nonempty. Now, for each i, take X_{i} to be A_{i} with the index i itself tacked on (renaming the indices using the disjoint union if necessary, we may assume that i is not a member of A_{i}, so simply take X_{i} = A_{i} ∪ {i}).

Now define the cartesian product
$$X = \prod_{i \in I} X_i$$
along with the natural projection maps π_{i} which take a member of X to its ith term.

We give each X_{j} the topology whose open sets are: the empty set, the singleton {i}, the set X_{i}. This makes X_{i} compact, and by Tychonoff's theorem, X is also compact (in the product topology). The projection maps are continuous; all the A_{i}'s are closed, being complements of the singleton open set {i} in X_{i}. So the inverse images π_{i}^{−1}(A_{i}) are closed subsets of X. We note that
$$\prod_{i \in I} A_i = \bigcap_{i \in I} \pi_i^{-1}(A_i)$$
and prove that these inverse images have the FIP. Let i_{1}, ..., i_{N} be a finite collection of indices in I. Then the finite product A_{i_{1}} × ... × A_{i_{N}} is non-empty (only finitely many choices here, so AC is not needed); it merely consists of N-tuples. Let a = (a_{1}, ..., a_{N}) be such an N-tuple. We extend a to the whole index set: take a to the function f defined by f(j) = a_{k} if j = i_{k}, and f(j) = j otherwise. This step is where the addition of the extra point to each space is crucial, for it allows us to define f for everything outside of the N-tuple in a precise way without choices (we can already choose, by construction, j from X_{j} ). π_{i_{k}}(f) = a_{k} is obviously an element of each A_{i_{k}} so that f is in each inverse image; thus we have
$$\bigcap_{k = 1}^N \pi_{i_k}^{-1}(A_{i_k}) \neq \varnothing.$$

By the FIP definition of compactness, the entire intersection over I must be nonempty, and the proof is complete.

== Application: the Hahn–Banach theorem ==
A standard proof of the Hahn-Banach theorem in functional analysis uses the axiom of choice in the form of Zorn's lemma. Tychonoff's theorem for compact Hausdorff spaces, which is strictly weaker than the axiom of choice and is equivalent to the Boolean prime ideal theorem, can be used to give an alternative proof.

Specifically, Tychonoff's theorem in the Hausdorff case is used to deduce the following variant of the axiom of choice. Given a family of nonempty compact Hausdorff spaces $K_x, \, x \in X$ parametrized by a set $X$, by a choice function for it, we shall mean a function

$$c : X \to U := \cup_{x \in X} K_x$$

such that $c(x) \in K_x$ for each $x$. Also, for a relation $R$ on $U$; i.e., a subset of $U \times U$, we say such $c$ is $R$-consistent on a set $S \subset X$ if $(c(x), c(y)) \in R$ for each $x, y \in S$.

Lemma—Assume, for each $x, y$ in $X$, that $R \cap (K_x \times K_y)$ is closed. Also, assume that for each finite subset $S \subset X$, there is a choice function for the family $K_x, \, x \in X$ that is $R$-consistent on $S$.

Then there exists a choice function for the family $K_x$ that is $R$-consistent on $X$.

Proof of lemma: let $P = \prod_{x \in X} K_x$, which is nonempty and compact (also Hausdorff). Consider the family $P^S$ parametrized by finite subsets $S \subset X$ and given by

$P^S =$ the set of all $c \in P$ that are $R$-consistent on $S$.

Each $P^S$ is the intersection of $p_{x, y}^{-1}(R \cap (K_x \times K_y))$ over $x, y \in S$, where $p_{x, y}(c) = (p_x(c), p_y(c))$. Thus, it is closed and nonempty by assumption. By compactness, the intersection $\cap_S P^S$ is nonempty and any element of it (which we can pick without the axiom of choice) is a required choice function. $\square$

Now, the Hahn-Banach theorem is proved as follows. Given a linear functional $f$ on a subspace $V_0 \subset V$ dominated by a seminorm $p$, consider

- $X$ = the set of all finite-dimensional subspaces of $V$.
- For each $W \in X$, $W'$ = its dual and $K_W = \{ g \in W' \mid g|_{W \cap V_0} = f|_{W \cap V_0}, \, |g| \le p \}.$
- $R = \{ (g, h) \in K_{W_1} \times K_{W_2} \mid W_i \in X, \, g|_{W_1 \cap W_2} = h|_{W_1 \cap W_2} \}$.

It is easy to see the assumptions of the lemma are satisfied and thus we find an $R$-consistent choice function $c$. Then the functional $g(x) = c(W)(x), \, W = \operatorname{span} \{ x \}$ is a required extension.

Incidentally, essentially the same proof can show that Tychonoff's theorem for compact Hausdorff spaces implies the Boolean prime ideal theorem. Indeed, on a Boolean algebra $B$, like in ring theory, to give a prime ideal is to give a homomorphism $B \to 2$. Then the idea in the above proof can be used to construct such a homomorphism, finishing the proof.
