= Boolean prime ideal theorem =

Ideals in a Boolean algebra can be extended to prime ideals

In mathematics, the Boolean prime ideal theorem states that ideals in a Boolean algebra can be extended to prime ideals. A variation of this statement for filters on sets is known as the ultrafilter lemma. Other theorems are obtained by considering different mathematical structures with appropriate notions of ideals, for example, rings and prime ideals (of ring theory), or distributive lattices and maximal ideals (of order theory). This article focuses on prime ideal theorems from order theory.

Although the various prime ideal theorems may appear simple and intuitive, they cannot be deduced in general from the axioms of Zermelo–Fraenkel set theory without the axiom of choice (abbreviated ZF). Instead, some of the statements turn out to be equivalent to the axiom of choice (AC), while others—the Boolean prime ideal theorem, for instance—represent a property that is strictly weaker than AC. It is due to this intermediate status between ZF and ZF + AC (ZFC) that the Boolean prime ideal theorem is often taken as an axiom of set theory. The abbreviations BPI or PIT (for Boolean algebras) are sometimes used to refer to this additional axiom.

== Prime ideal theorems ==
An order ideal is a (non-empty) directed lower set. If the considered partially ordered set (poset) has binary suprema (a.k.a. joins), as do the posets within this article, then this is equivalently characterized as a non-empty lower set I that is closed for binary suprema (that is, $x, y \in I$ implies $x \vee y \in I$). An ideal I is prime if its set-theoretic complement in the poset is a filter (that is, $x \wedge y \in I$ implies $x \in I$ or $y \in I$). Ideals are proper if they are not equal to the whole poset.

Historically, the first statement relating to later prime ideal theorems was in fact referring to filters—subsets that are ideals with respect to the dual order. The ultrafilter lemma states that every filter on a set is contained within some maximal (proper) filter—an ultrafilter. Recall that filters on sets are proper filters of the Boolean algebra of its powerset. In this special case, maximal filters (i.e. filters that are not strict subsets of any proper filter) and prime filters (i.e. filters that with each union of subsets X and Y contain also X or Y) coincide. The dual of this statement thus assures that every ideal of a powerset is contained in a prime ideal.

The above statement led to various generalized prime ideal theorems, each of which exists in a weak and in a strong form. Weak prime ideal theorems state that every non-trivial algebra of a certain class has at least one prime ideal. In contrast, strong prime ideal theorems require that every ideal that is disjoint from a given filter can be extended to a prime ideal that is still disjoint from that filter. In the case of algebras that are not posets, one uses different substructures instead of filters. Many forms of these theorems are actually known to be equivalent, so that the assertion that "PIT" holds is usually taken as the assertion that the corresponding statement for Boolean algebras (BPI) is valid.

Another variation of similar theorems is obtained by replacing each occurrence of prime ideal by maximal ideal. The corresponding maximal ideal theorems (MIT) are often—though not always—stronger than their PIT equivalents.

== Boolean prime ideal theorem ==
The Boolean prime ideal theorem is the strong prime ideal theorem for Boolean algebras. Thus the formal statement is:

Let B be a Boolean algebra, let I be an ideal and let F be a filter of B, such that I and F are disjoint. Then I is contained in some prime ideal of B that is disjoint from F.

The weak prime ideal theorem for Boolean algebras simply states:

Every Boolean algebra contains a prime ideal.

We refer to these statements as the weak and strong BPI. The two are equivalent, as the strong BPI clearly implies the weak BPI, and the reverse implication can be achieved by using the weak BPI to find prime ideals in the appropriate quotient algebra.

The BPI can be expressed in various ways. For this purpose, recall the following theorem:

For any ideal I of a Boolean algebra B, the following are equivalent:

- I is a prime ideal.
- I is a maximal ideal, i.e. for any proper ideal J, if I is contained in J then I = J.
- For every element a of B, I contains exactly one of {a, ¬a}.

This theorem is a well-known fact for Boolean algebras. Its dual establishes the equivalence of prime filters and ultrafilters. Note that the last property is in fact self-dual—only the prior assumption that I is an ideal gives the full characterization. All of the implications within this theorem can be proven in ZF.

Thus the following (strong) maximal ideal theorem (MIT) for Boolean algebras is equivalent to BPI:

Let B be a Boolean algebra, let I be an ideal and let F be a filter of B, such that I and F are disjoint. Then I is contained in some maximal ideal of B that is disjoint from F.

Note that one requires "global" maximality, not just maximality with respect to being disjoint from F. Yet, this variation yields another equivalent characterization of BPI:

Let B be a Boolean algebra, let I be an ideal and let F be a filter of B, such that I and F are disjoint. Then I is contained in some ideal of B that is maximal among all ideals disjoint from F.

The fact that this statement is equivalent to BPI is easily established by noting the following theorem: For any distributive lattice L, if an ideal I is maximal among all ideals of L that are disjoint to a given filter F, then I is a prime ideal. The proof for this statement (which can again be carried out in ZF set theory) is included in the article on ideals. Since any Boolean algebra is a distributive lattice, this shows the desired implication.

All of the above statements are now easily seen to be equivalent. Going even further, one can exploit the fact the dual orders of Boolean algebras are exactly the Boolean algebras themselves. Hence, when taking the equivalent duals of all former statements, one ends up with a number of theorems that equally apply to Boolean algebras, but where every occurrence of ideal is replaced by filter. It is worth noting that for the special case where the Boolean algebra under consideration is a powerset with the subset ordering, the "maximal filter theorem" is called the ultrafilter lemma.

Summing up, for Boolean algebras, the weak and strong MIT, the weak and strong PIT, and these statements with filters in place of ideals are all equivalent. It is known that all of these statements are consequences of the axiom of choice, AC (the easy proof makes use of Zorn's lemma), but cannot be proven in ZF (Zermelo-Fraenkel set theory without AC), if ZF is consistent. Yet, the BPI is strictly weaker than the axiom of choice, though the proof of this statement, due to J. D. Halpern and Azriel Lévy, is rather non-trivial.

== Further prime ideal theorems ==
The prototypical properties that were discussed for Boolean algebras in the above section can easily be modified to include more general lattices, such as distributive lattices or Heyting algebras. However, in these cases maximal ideals are different from prime ideals, and the relation between PITs and MITs is not obvious.

Indeed, it turns out that the MITs for distributive lattices and even for Heyting algebras are equivalent to the axiom of choice. On the other hand, it is known that the strong PIT for distributive lattices is equivalent to BPI (i.e. to the MIT and PIT for Boolean algebras). Hence this statement is strictly weaker than the axiom of choice. Furthermore, observe that Heyting algebras are not self dual, and thus using filters in place of ideals yields different theorems in this setting. Maybe surprisingly, the MIT for the duals of Heyting algebras is not stronger than BPI, which is in sharp contrast to the abovementioned MIT for Heyting algebras.

Finally, prime ideal theorems do also exist for other (not order-theoretical) abstract algebras. For example, the MIT for rings implies the axiom of choice. This situation requires to replace the order-theoretic term "filter" by other concepts—for rings a "multiplicatively closed subset" is appropriate.

== The ultrafilter lemma ==
A filter on a set X is a nonempty collection of nonempty subsets of X that is closed under finite intersection and under superset. An ultrafilter is a maximal filter. The ultrafilter lemma states that every filter on a set X is a subset of some ultrafilter on X. An ultrafilter that does not contain finite sets is called "non-principal". The ultrafilter lemma, and in particular the existence of non-principal ultrafilters (consider the filter of all sets with finite complements), can be proven from Zorn's lemma.

The ultrafilter lemma is equivalent to the Boolean prime ideal theorem, with the equivalence provable in ZF set theory without the axiom of choice. The idea behind the proof is that the subsets of any set form a Boolean algebra partially ordered by inclusion, and any Boolean algebra is representable as an algebra of sets by Stone's representation theorem.

If the set X is finite then the ultrafilter lemma can be proven from the axioms ZF. This is no longer true for infinite sets; an additional axiom must be assumed. Zorn's lemma, the axiom of choice, and Tychonoff's theorem can all be used to prove the ultrafilter lemma. The ultrafilter lemma is strictly weaker than the axiom of choice.

The ultrafilter lemma has many applications in topology. The ultrafilter lemma can be used to prove the Hahn-Banach theorem and the Alexander subbase theorem.

== Applications ==
Intuitively, the Boolean prime ideal theorem states that there are "enough" prime ideals in a Boolean algebra in the sense that we can extend every ideal to a maximal one. This is of practical importance for proving Stone's representation theorem for Boolean algebras, a special case of Stone duality, in which one equips the set of all prime ideals with a certain topology and can indeed regain the original Boolean algebra (up to isomorphism) from this data. Furthermore, it turns out that in applications one can freely choose either to work with prime ideals or with prime filters, because every ideal uniquely determines a filter: the set of all Boolean complements of its elements. Both approaches are found in the literature.

Many other theorems of general topology that are often said to rely on the axiom of choice are in fact equivalent to BPI. For example, the theorem that a product of compact Hausdorff spaces is compact is equivalent to it. If we leave out "Hausdorff" we get a theorem equivalent to the full axiom of choice.

In graph theory, the de Bruijn–Erdős theorem is another equivalent to BPI. It states that, if a given infinite graph requires at least some finite number k in any graph coloring, then it has a finite subgraph that also requires k.

A not too well known application of the Boolean prime ideal theorem is the existence of a non-measurable set (the example usually given is the Vitali set, which requires the axiom of choice). From this and the fact that the BPI is strictly weaker than the axiom of choice, it follows that the existence of non-measurable sets is strictly weaker than the axiom of choice.

In linear algebra, the Boolean prime ideal theorem can be used to prove that any two bases of a given vector space have the same cardinality.

== See also ==
- List of Boolean algebra topics
