= Fréchet filter =

Collection of all cofinite subsets of given set

In mathematics, the Fréchet filter, also called the cofinite filter, on a set $X$ is a certain collection of subsets of $X$ (that is, it is a particular subset of the power set of $X$). A subset $F$ of $X$ belongs to the Fréchet filter if and only if the complement of $F$ in $X$ is finite. Any such set $F$ is said to be cofinite in $X$, which is why it is alternatively called the cofinite filter on $X$.

The Fréchet filter is of interest in topology, where filters originated, and relates to order and lattice theory because a set's power set is a partially ordered set under set inclusion (more specifically, it forms a lattice). The Fréchet filter is named after the French mathematician Maurice Fréchet (1878-1973), who worked in topology.

== Definition ==
A subset $A$ of a set $X$ is said to be cofinite in $X$ if its complement in $X$ (that is, the set $X \setminus A$) is finite. The Fréchet filter on $X$, denoted by $F$ is the set of all cofinite subsets of $X$. That is:
$$F = \{A \subseteq X : X \setminus A \; \text{ is finite }\}.$$

This makes $F$ a filter on the lattice $(\mathcal{P}(X), \subseteq),$ the power set $\mathcal{P}(X)$ of $X$ with set inclusion.

Letting $S^{\operatorname{c}}$ denote the complement of a set $S$ in $X,$ the following two conditions hold:

Intersection condition
If two sets are finitely complemented in $X$, then so is their intersection, since $(A \cap B)^{\operatorname{c}} = A^{\operatorname{c}} \cup B^{\operatorname{c}},$ and
Upper-set condition
If a set is finitely complemented in $X$, then so are its supersets in $X$.

== Properties ==
If the base set $X$ is finite, then $F = \mathcal{P}(X)$ since every subset of $X$, and in particular every complement, is then finite. This case is sometimes excluded by definition or else called the improper filter on $X.$ Allowing $X$ to be finite creates a single exception to the Fréchet filter’s being free and non-principal since a filter on a finite set cannot be free and a non-principal filter cannot contain any singletons as members.

If $X$ is infinite, then every member of $F$ is infinite since it is simply $X$ minus finitely many of its members. Additionally, $F$ is infinite since one of its subsets is the set of all $\{x\}^{\operatorname{C}},$ where $x \in X.$

The Fréchet filter is both free and non-principal, excepting the finite case mentioned above, and is included in every free filter. It is also the dual filter of the ideal of all finite subsets of (infinite) $X$.

The Fréchet filter is not necessarily an ultrafilter (or maximal proper filter). Consider the power set $\mathcal{P}(\N),$ where $\N$ is the natural numbers. The set of even numbers is the complement of the set of odd numbers. Since neither of these sets is finite, neither set is in the Fréchet filter on $\N.$ However, an ultrafilter (and any other non-degenerate filter) is free if and only if it includes the Fréchet filter. The ultrafilter lemma states that every non-degenerate filter is contained in some ultrafilter. The existence of free ultrafilters was established by Tarski in 1930, relying on a theorem equivalent to the axiom of choice, and is used in the construction of the hyperreals in nonstandard analysis.

== Examples ==
On the set $\N$ of natural numbers, the set of infinite intervals $B = \{(n, \infty) : n \in \N\}$ is a Fréchet filter base, that is, the Fréchet filter on $\N$ consists of all supersets of elements of $B$.

== See also ==
- Boolean prime ideal theorem – Ideals in a Boolean algebra can be extended to prime ideals
- Filter (mathematics) – Special subset of a partially ordered set
- Filter on a set – Family of subsets representing "large" sets
- Filters in topology – Use of filters to describe and characterize all basic topological notions and results
- Ultrafilter on a set – Maximal proper filter
