= Initial topology =

Coarsest topology making certain functions continuous

In general topology and related areas of mathematics, the initial topology (or induced topology or weak topology or limit topology or projective topology) on a set $X,$ with respect to a family of functions on $X,$ is the coarsest topology on $X$ that makes those functions continuous.

The subspace topology and product topology constructions are both special cases of initial topologies. Indeed, the initial topology construction can be viewed as a generalization of these.

The dual notion is the final topology, which for a given family of functions mapping to a set $Y$ is the finest topology on $Y$ that makes those functions continuous.

== Definition ==
Given a set $X$ and an indexed family $\left(Y_i\right)_{i \in I}$ of topological spaces with functions
$$f_i : X \to Y_i,$$
the initial topology $\tau$ on $X$ is the coarsest topology on $X$ such that each
$$f_i : (X, \tau) \to Y_i$$
is continuous.

Definition in terms of open sets

If $\left(\tau_i\right)_{i \in I}$ is a family of topologies $X$ indexed by $I \neq \varnothing,$ then the least upper bound topology of these topologies is the coarsest topology on $X$ that is finer than each $\tau_i.$ This topology always exists and it is equal to the topology generated by $\bigcup_{i \in I} \tau_i.$

If for every $i \in I,$ $\sigma_i$ denotes the topology on $Y_i,$ then $f_i^{-1}\left(\sigma_i\right) = \left\{f_i^{-1}(V) : V \in \sigma_i\right\}$ is a topology on $X$, and the initial topology of the $Y_i$ by the mappings $f_i$ is the least upper bound topology of the $I$-indexed family of topologies $f_i^{-1}\left(\sigma_i\right)$ (for $i \in I$). Explicitly, the initial topology is the collection of open sets generated by all sets of the form $f_i^{-1}(U),$ where $U$ is an open set in $Y_i$ for some $i \in I,$ under finite intersections and arbitrary unions.

Sets of the form $f_i^{-1}(V)$ are often called cylinder sets. If $I$ contains exactly one element, then all the open sets of the initial topology $(X, \tau)$ are cylinder sets.

== Examples ==
Several topological constructions can be regarded as special cases of the initial topology.

- The subspace topology is the initial topology on the subspace with respect to the inclusion map.
- The product topology is the initial topology with respect to the family of projection maps.
- The inverse limit (also called projective limit) of any inverse system of spaces and continuous maps is the set-theoretic inverse limit together with the initial topology determined by the canonical morphisms.
- The weak topology on a locally convex space is the initial topology with respect to the continuous linear forms of its dual space.
- Given a family of topologies $\left\{\tau_i\right\}$ on a fixed set $X$ the initial topology on $X$ with respect to the functions $\operatorname{id}_i : X \to \left(X, \tau_i\right)$ is the supremum (or join) of the topologies $\left\{\tau_i\right\}$ in the lattice of topologies on $X.$ That is, the initial topology $\tau$ is the topology generated by the union of the topologies $\left\{\tau_i\right\}.$
- A topological space is completely regular if and only if it has the initial topology with respect to its family of (bounded) real-valued continuous functions.
- Every topological space $X$ has the initial topology with respect to the family of continuous functions from $X$ to the Sierpiński space.

== Properties ==
=== Characteristic property ===
The initial topology on $X$ can be characterized by the following characteristic property:
A function $g$ from some space $Z$ to $X$ is continuous if and only if $f_i \circ g$ is continuous for each $i \in I.$

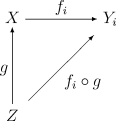
Characteristic property of the initial topology

Note that, despite looking quite similar, this is not a universal property. A categorical description is given below.

A filter $\mathcal{B}$ on $X$ converges to a point $x \in X$ if and only if the prefilter $f_i(\mathcal{B})$ converges to $f_i(x)$ for every $i \in I.$

=== Evaluation ===
By the universal property of the product topology, we know that any family of continuous maps $f_i : X \to Y_i$ determines a unique continuous map
$$\begin{alignat}{4}
f :\;&& X &&\;\to    \;& \prod_i Y_i \\[0.3ex]
&& x &&\;\mapsto\;& \left(f_i(x)\right)_{i \in I} \\
\end{alignat}$$

This map is known as the evaluation map.

A family of maps $\{f_i : X \to Y_i\}$ is said to separate points in $X$ if for all $x \neq y$ in $X$ there exists some $i$ such that $f_i(x) \neq f_i(y).$ The family $\{f_i\}$ separates points if and only if the associated evaluation map $f$ is injective.

The evaluation map $f$ will be a topological embedding if and only if $X$ has the initial topology determined by the maps $\{f_i\}$ and this family of maps separates points in $X.$

=== Hausdorffness ===
If $X$ has the initial topology induced by $\left\{f_i : X \to Y_i\right\}$ and if every $Y_i$ is Hausdorff, then $X$ is a Hausdorff space if and only if these maps separate points on $X.$

=== Transitivity of the initial topology ===
If $X$ has the initial topology induced by the $I$-indexed family of mappings $\left\{f_i : X \to Y_i\right\}$ and if for every $i \in I,$ the topology on $Y_i$ is the initial topology induced by some $J_i$-indexed family of mappings $\left\{g_j : Y_i \to Z_j\right\}$ (as $j$ ranges over $J_i$), then the initial topology on $X$ induced by $\left\{f_i : X \to Y_i\right\}$ is equal to the initial topology induced by the ${\textstyle \bigcup\limits_{i \in I} J_i}$-indexed family of mappings $\left\{g_j \circ f_i : X \to Z_j\right\}$ as $i$ ranges over $I$ and $j$ ranges over $J_i.$ Several important corollaries of this fact are now given.

In particular, if $S \subseteq X$ then the subspace topology that $S$ inherits from $X$ is equal to the initial topology induced by the inclusion map $S \to X$ (defined by $s \mapsto s$). Consequently, if $X$ has the initial topology induced by $\left\{f_i : X \to Y_i\right\}$ then the subspace topology that $S$ inherits from $X$ is equal to the initial topology induced on $S$ by the restrictions $\left\{\left.f_i\right|_S : S \to Y_i\right\}$ of the $f_i$ to $S.$

The product topology on $\prod_i Y_i$ is equal to the initial topology induced by the canonical projections $\operatorname{pr}_i : \left(x_k\right)_{k \in I} \mapsto x_i$ as $i$ ranges over $I.$ Consequently, the initial topology on $X$ induced by $\left\{f_i : X \to Y_i\right\}$ is equal to the inverse image of the product topology on $\prod_i Y_i$ by the evaluation map $f : X \to \prod_i Y_i\,.$ Furthermore, if the maps $\left\{f_i\right\}_{i \in I}$ separate points on $X$ then the evaluation map is a homeomorphism onto the subspace $f(X)$ of the product space $\prod_i Y_i.$

=== Separating points from closed sets ===
If a space $X$ comes equipped with a topology, it is often useful to know whether or not the topology on $X$ is the initial topology induced by some family of maps on $X.$ This section gives a sufficient (but not necessary) condition.

A family of maps $\left\{f_i : X \to Y_i\right\}$ separates points from closed sets in $X$ if for all closed sets $A$ in $X$ and all $x \not\in A,$ there exists some $i$ such that
$$f_i(x) \notin \operatorname{cl}(f_i(A))$$
where $\operatorname{cl}$ denotes the closure operator.

Theorem. A family of continuous maps $\left\{f_i : X \to Y_i\right\}$ separates points from closed sets if and only if the cylinder sets $f_i^{-1}(V),$ for $V$ open in $Y_i,$ form a base for the topology on $X.$

It follows that whenever $\left\{f_i\right\}$ separates points from closed sets, the space $X$ has the initial topology induced by the maps $\left\{f_i\right\}.$ The converse fails, since generally the cylinder sets will only form a subbase (and not a base) for the initial topology.

If the space $X$ is a T_{0} space, then any collection of maps $\left\{f_i\right\}$ that separates points from closed sets in $X$ must also separate points. In this case, the evaluation map will be an embedding.

=== Initial uniform structure ===
If $\left(\mathcal{U}_i\right)_{i \in I}$ is a family of uniform structures on $X$ indexed by $I \neq \varnothing,$ then the least upper bound uniform structure of $\left(\mathcal{U}_i\right)_{i \in I}$ is the coarsest uniform structure on $X$ that is finer than each $\mathcal{U}_i.$ This uniform always exists and it is equal to the filter on $X \times X$ generated by the filter subbase ${\textstyle \bigcup\limits_{i \in I} \mathcal{U}_i}.$ If $\tau_i$ is the topology on $X$ induced by the uniform structure $\mathcal{U}_i$ then the topology on $X$ associated with least upper bound uniform structure is equal to the least upper bound topology of $\left(\tau_i\right)_{i \in I}.$

Now suppose that $\left\{f_i : X \to Y_i\right\}$ is a family of maps and for every $i \in I,$ let $\mathcal{U}_i$ be a uniform structure on $Y_i.$ Then the initial uniform structure of the $Y_i$ by the mappings $f_i$ is the unique coarsest uniform structure $\mathcal{U}$ on $X$ making all $f_i : \left(X, \mathcal{U}\right) \to \left(Y_i, \mathcal{U}_i\right)$ uniformly continuous. It is equal to the least upper bound uniform structure of the $I$-indexed family of uniform structures $f_i^{-1}\left(\mathcal{U}_i\right)$ (for $i \in I$). The topology on $X$ induced by $\mathcal{U}$ is the coarsest topology on $X$ such that every $f_i : X \to Y_i$ is continuous. The initial uniform structure $\mathcal{U}$ is also equal to the coarsest uniform structure such that the identity mappings $\operatorname{id} : \left(X, \mathcal{U}\right) \to \left(X, f_i^{-1}\left(\mathcal{U}_i\right)\right)$ are uniformly continuous.

Hausdorffness: The topology on $X$ induced by the initial uniform structure $\mathcal{U}$ is Hausdorff if and only if for whenever $x, y \in X$ are distinct ($x \neq y$) then there exists some $i \in I$ and some entourage $V_i \in \mathcal{U}_i$ of $Y_i$ such that $\left(f_i(x), f_i(y)\right) \not\in V_i.$ Furthermore, if for every index $i \in I,$ the topology on $Y_i$ induced by $\mathcal{U}_i$ is Hausdorff then the topology on $X$ induced by the initial uniform structure $\mathcal{U}$ is Hausdorff if and only if the maps $\left\{f_i : X \to Y_i\right\}$ separate points on $X$ (or equivalently, if and only if the evaluation map $f : X \to \prod_i Y_i$ is injective)

Uniform continuity: If $\mathcal{U}$ is the initial uniform structure induced by the mappings $\left\{f_i : X \to Y_i\right\},$ then a function $g$ from some uniform space $Z$ into $(X, \mathcal{U})$ is uniformly continuous if and only if $f_i \circ g : Z \to Y_i$ is uniformly continuous for each $i \in I.$

Cauchy filter: A filter $\mathcal{B}$ on $X$ is a Cauchy filter on $(X, \mathcal{U})$ if and only if $f_i\left(\mathcal{B}\right)$ is a Cauchy prefilter on $Y_i$ for every $i \in I.$

Transitivity of the initial uniform structure: If the word "topology" is replaced with "uniform structure" in the statement of "transitivity of the initial topology" given above, then the resulting statement will also be true.

== Categorical description ==
In the language of category theory, the initial topology construction can be described as follows. Let $Y$ be the functor from a discrete category $J$ to the category of topological spaces $\mathrm{Top}$ which maps $j\mapsto Y_j$. Let $U$ be the usual forgetful functor from $\mathrm{Top}$ to $\mathrm{Set}$. The maps $f_j : X \to Y_j$ can then be thought of as a cone from $X$ to $UY.$ That is, $(X,f)$ is an object of $\mathrm{Cone}(UY) := (\Delta\downarrow{UY})$—the category of cones to $UY.$ More precisely, this cone $(X,f)$ defines a $U$-structured cosink in $\mathrm{Set}.$

The forgetful functor $U : \mathrm{Top} \to \mathrm{Set}$ induces a functor $\bar{U} : \mathrm{Cone}(Y) \to \mathrm{Cone}(UY)$. The characteristic property of the initial topology is equivalent to the statement that there exists a universal morphism from $\bar{U}$ to $(X,f);$ that is, a terminal object in the category $\left(\bar{U}\downarrow(X,f)\right).$
Explicitly, this consists of an object $I(X,f)$ in $\mathrm{Cone}(Y)$ together with a morphism $\varepsilon : \bar{U} I(X,f) \to (X,f)$ such that for any object $(Z,g)$ in $\mathrm{Cone}(Y)$ and morphism $\varphi : \bar{U}(Z,g) \to (X,f)$ there exists a unique morphism $\zeta : (Z,g) \to I(X,f)$ such that the following diagram commutes:

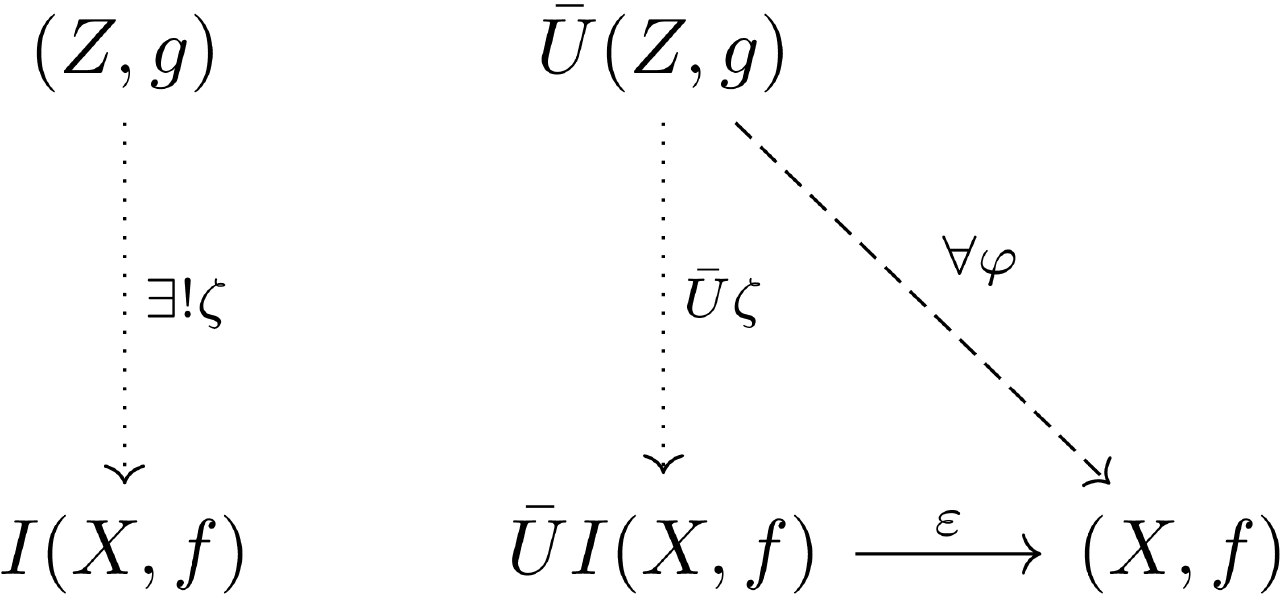

The assignment $(X,f) \mapsto I(X,f)$ placing the initial topology on $X$ extends to a functor $I : \mathrm{Cone}(UY) \to \mathrm{Cone}(Y)$ which is right adjoint to the forgetful functor $\bar{U}.$ In fact, $I$ is a right-inverse to $\bar{U}$; since $\bar{U}I$ is the identity functor on $\mathrm{Cone}(UY).$

== See also ==
- Final topology – Finest topology making some functions continuous
- Product topology – Topology on Cartesian products of topological spaces
- Quotient space (topology) – Topological space construction
- Subspace topology – Inherited topology

== Bibliography ==
- Bourbaki, Nicolas (1989) [1966]. General Topology: Chapters 1–4 [Topologie Générale]. Éléments de mathématique. Berlin New York: Springer Science & Business Media. doi:10.1007/978-3-642-61701-0. ISBN 978-3-540-64241-1. OCLC 18588129.
- Bourbaki, Nicolas (1989) [1967]. General Topology 2: Chapters 5–10 [Topologie Générale]. Éléments de mathématique. Vol. 4. Berlin New York: Springer Science & Business Media. ISBN 978-3-540-64563-4. OCLC 246032063.
- Dugundji, James (1966). Topology. Boston: Allyn and Bacon. ISBN 978-0-697-06889-7. OCLC 395340485.
- Grothendieck, Alexander (1973). Topological Vector Spaces. Translated by Chaljub, Orlando. New York: Gordon and Breach Science Publishers. ISBN 978-0-677-30020-7. OCLC 886098.
- Willard, Stephen (2004) [1970]. General Topology. Mineola, N.Y.: Dover Publications. ISBN 978-0-486-43479-7. OCLC 115240.
- Willard, Stephen (1970). General Topology. Reading, Massachusetts: Addison-Wesley. ISBN 0-486-43479-6.
