= Alexander's subbase lemma =

Theorem in topology

In mathematics, specifically topology, Alexander's subbase lemma states that for a topological space to be a compact, it is necessary and sufficient that each open cover of the space consisting of sets in a (fixed) subbase has a finite subcover. Precisely,

given a topological space $X$ and a subbase $S$ for it, a subset $K \subset X$ is compact if and only if for each cover of $K$ consisting of sets in $S$, there exists a finite subcover of it.

The lemma, also often called Alexander's subbase theorem, is due to James Waddell Alexander II. The lemma is typically used to prove Tychonoff's theorem.

== Proof ==
If $K$ is compact, the existence of a finite cover holds by definition. So, we shall show the converse and without loss of generality, replace $X$ by $K$.

Suppose for the sake of contradiction that the space $X$ is not compact (so $X$ is an infinite set), yet every subbasic cover from $\mathcal{S}$ has a finite subcover. Let $\mathbb{S}$ denote the set of all open covers of $X$ that do not have any finite subcover of $X.$ Partially order $\mathbb{S}$ by subset inclusion and use Zorn's Lemma to find an element $\mathcal{C} \in \mathbb{S}$ that is a maximal element of $\mathbb{S}.$ Observe that:

1. Since $\mathcal{C} \in \mathbb{S},$ by definition of $\mathbb{S},$ $\mathcal{C}$ is an open cover of $X$ and there does not exist any finite subset of $\mathcal{C}$ that covers $X$ (so in particular, $\mathcal{C}$ is infinite).
2. The maximality of $\mathcal{C}$ in $\mathbb{S}$ implies that if $V$ is an open set of $X$ such that $V \not\in \mathcal{C}$ then $\mathcal{C} \cup \{V\}$ has a finite subcover, which must necessarily be of the form $\{V\} \cup \mathcal{C}_V$ for some finite subset $\mathcal{C}_V$ of $\mathcal{C}$ (this finite subset depends on the choice of $V$).

We will begin by showing that $\mathcal{C} \cap \mathcal{S}$ is not a cover of $X.$ Suppose that $\mathcal{C} \cap \mathcal{S}$ was a cover of $X,$ which in particular implies that $\mathcal{C} \cap \mathcal{S}$ is a cover of $X$ by elements of $\mathcal{S}.$ The theorem's hypothesis on $\mathcal{S}$ implies that there exists a finite subset of $\mathcal{C} \cap \mathcal{S}$ that covers $X,$ which would simultaneously also be a finite subcover of $X$ by elements of $\mathcal{C}$ (since $\mathcal{C} \cap \mathcal{S} \subseteq \mathcal{C}$). But this contradicts $\mathcal{C} \in \mathbb{S},$ which proves that $\mathcal{C} \cap \mathcal{S}$ does not cover $X.$

Since $\mathcal{C} \cap \mathcal{S}$ does not cover $X,$ there exists some $x \in X$ that is not covered by $\mathcal{C} \cap \mathcal{S}$ (that is, $x$ is not contained in any element of $\mathcal{C} \cap \mathcal{S}$). But since $\mathcal{C}$ does cover $X,$ there also exists some $U \in \mathcal{C}$ such that $x \in U.$ It follows that $U\neq X$, because otherwise it would imply $\mathcal{C}$ has a finite subcover of $X$, namely the subcover $\{U\}=\{X\},$ contradicting $\mathcal{C}\in \mathbb{S}.$ Since $U\neq X,$ and $\mathcal{S}$ is a subbasis generating $X$'s topology (together with $X$), from the definition of the topology generated by $\mathcal{S},$ there must exist a finite collection of subbasic open sets $S_1, \ldots, S_n \in \mathcal{S}$ with $n\ge 1$ such that
$$x \in S_1 \cap \cdots \cap S_n \subseteq U.$$

We will now show by contradiction that $S_i \not\in \mathcal{C}$ for every $i = 1, \ldots, n.$ If $i$ was such that $S_i \in \mathcal{C},$ then also $S_i \in \mathcal{C} \cap \mathcal{S}$ so the fact that $x \in S_i$ would then imply that $x$ is covered by $\mathcal{C} \cap \mathcal{S},$ which contradicts how $x$ was chosen (recall that $x$ was chosen specifically so that it was not covered by $\mathcal{C} \cap \mathcal{S}$).

As mentioned earlier, the maximality of $\mathcal{C}$ in $\mathbb{S}$ implies that for every $i = 1, \ldots, n,$ there exists a finite subset $\mathcal{C}_{S_i}$ of $\mathcal{C}$ such that$\left\{S_i\right\} \cup \mathcal{C}_{S_i}$ forms a finite cover of $X.$ Define
$$\mathcal{C}_F := \mathcal{C}_{S_1} \cup \cdots \cup \mathcal{C}_{S_n},$$
which is a finite subset of $\mathcal{C}.$ Observe that for every $i = 1, \ldots, n,$ $\left\{S_i\right\} \cup \mathcal{C}_F$ is a finite cover of $X$ so let us replace every $\mathcal{C}_{S_i}$ with $\mathcal{C}_F.$

Let $\cup \mathcal{C}_F$ denote the union of all sets in $\mathcal{C}_F$ (which is an open subset of $X$) and let $Z$ denote the complement of $\cup \mathcal{C}_F$ in $X.$ Observe that for any subset $A \subseteq X,$ $\{A\} \cup \mathcal{C}_F$ covers $X$ if and only if $Z \subseteq A.$ In particular, for every $i = 1, \ldots, n,$ the fact that $\left\{S_i\right\} \cup \mathcal{C}_F$ covers $X$ implies that $Z \subseteq S_i.$ Since $i$ was arbitrary, we have $Z \subseteq S_1 \cap \cdots \cap S_n.$ Recalling that $S_1 \cap \cdots \cap S_n \subseteq U,$ we thus have $Z \subseteq U,$ which is equivalent to $\{U\} \cup \mathcal{C}_F$ being a cover of $X.$ Moreover, $\{U\} \cup \mathcal{C}_F$ is a finite cover of $X$ with $\{U\} \cup \mathcal{C}_F \subseteq \mathcal{C}.$ Thus $\mathcal{C}$ has a finite subcover of $X,$ which contradicts the fact that $\mathcal{C} \in \mathbb{S}.$ Therefore, the original assumption that $X$ is not compact must be wrong, which proves that $X$ is compact. $\blacksquare$

Although this proof makes use of Zorn's Lemma, the proof does not need the full strength of choice. Instead, it relies on the intermediate Ultrafilter principle.

== Application ==
Tychonoff's theorem, which states that the product of non-empty compact spaces is compact, has a short proof using the lemma.

The product topology on $\prod_{i} X_i$ has, by definition, a subbase consisting of cylinder sets that are the inverse projections of an open set in one factor. Given a subbasic family $C$ of the product that does not have a finite subset which covers $X$ (we do not require $C$ is a cover of $X$), we can partition $C = \cup_i C_i$ into subfamilies that consist of exactly those cylinder sets corresponding to a given factor space. By assumption, $C_i$ does not have a finite cover of $X$. Being cylinder sets, this means their projections onto $X_i$ have no finite cover of $X_i$. Since each $X_i$ is compact, these projections do not cover $X_i$. Find a point $x_i \in X_i$ not contained in any of the projections of $C_i$ onto $X_i$. Repeating this for all $C_i$ yields a point $\left(x_i\right)_i \in \prod_{i} X_i$ which is not covered by $C$. $\blacksquare$

Note, that in the last step we implicitly used the axiom of choice (which is actually equivalent to Zorn's lemma) to ensure the existence of $\left(x_i\right)_i.$
