= Filters in topology =

Application of set theory concept

In mathematics, a filter on a set is a collection of nonempty subsets which is upward closed and closed under finite intersections (see Filter on a set for a more detailed discussion). An example of a filter is the collection of neighborhoods of a point in a topological space. This article is focused on applications of filters to topology.

Filters were introduced by Henri Cartan in 1937 as an alternative to the related notion of a net developed in 1922 by E. H. Moore and Herman L. Smith. In metric spaces, and more generally in sequential spaces, basic topological notions such as open set, closed set, convergence, continuity, compactness and more can be fully characterized in terms of sequences, as studied in real analysis. But in other classes of spaces, sequences are insufficient. Filters and nets both provide ways to generalize the notion of convergence and characterize all these topological notions in general topological spaces. Filters also provide a common framework for defining various types of limits of functions, including limits from the left or right, to infinity, to a point or a set.

In particular, filters and nets provide equivalent notions of convergence: to each net one can associate a filter, and to each filter a net, so that the net converges to a point if and only if the same is true of the associated filter, and vice versa. So the use of one or the other is often a matter of convenience.

Besides characterizing topological notions, filters and ultrafilters, which are a special type of filter, are used extensively in general topology for constructing topological spaces of interest.

== Definitions ==
Let $X$ be a set and $\mathfrak{P}(X)$ the power set of it.

A filter $\mathcal{F}$ is a subset of $\mathfrak{P}(X) - \{ \emptyset \}$ having the properties:

1. (upward closed) for a subset $T \subset X$, if $T \supset S$ for some $S\in \mathcal{F}$, then $T\in \mathcal{F}$.
2. (directed downward) for each finite subset $\mathcal{E} \subset \mathcal{F}$, the intersection of $\mathcal{E}$ contains a set in $\mathcal{F}$.

By (1), the intersection of $\mathcal{E}$ in (2) itself is in $\mathcal{F}$. Taking $\mathcal{E}$ to be the empty set, (2) then implies $X$ is in $\mathcal{F}$, by the convention that the intersection of the empty set is the entire set.

A subset of $\mathfrak{P}(X) - \{ \emptyset \}$ is called a filter base if it satisfies condition (2). A family $\mathcal{B}$ of subsets of $X$ is a filter base if and only if
$$\mathcal{F}_\mathcal{B} := \bigcup_{S \in \mathcal{B}} \{ T \in \mathfrak{P}(X) \mid T \supset S \}$$
is a filter (in short, $\mathcal{F}_\mathcal{B}$ is the upper closure of $B$). Then, the filter $\mathcal{F}_\mathcal{B}$ is the smallest filter containing $\mathcal{B}$; $\mathcal{F}_\mathcal{B}$ is called the filter generated by $\mathcal{B}$ and $\mathcal{B}$ called a base for $\mathcal{F}_\mathcal{B}$.

In topology, these notions are used when $X$ is a topological space. For example, a neighborhood base at a point $x$ is a filter base and the filter it generates is the set of subsets of $X$ containing a neighborhood of $x$ (the neighborhood filter of the point).

A base for the space is generally not a filter base since it may contain disjoint sets, but the subset of a base consisting of all sets containing some given nonempty set is a filter base.

In practice, filter bases are often more convenient than filters, and some authors (e.g., Dugundji) exclusively work with filter bases instead of filters.

=== Finite intersection property ===
A subset $\mathcal{E} \subset \mathfrak{P}(X)$ is said to have the finite intersection property if each finite subset of it has nonempty intersection. Any filter is an example of a family of sets with the finite intersection property. In fact, more generally, each subset of a filter has the finite intersection property.

Conversely, if a family of sets $\mathcal{E}$ has the finite intersection property, then it is contained in a filter (namely, the filter generated by all intersections of finite subsets of $\mathcal{E}$).

== Convergence ==
A filter base $\mathcal{B}$ is said to converge to a point $p$ if each neighborhood of $p$ contains a set in $\mathcal{B}$, or, equivalently, if the filter generated by $\mathcal{B}$ contains every neighborhood of $p$. Such a $p$ is then called a limit point of $\mathcal{B}$. A filter base may have no limit point, or one or more limit points.

Convergence of filters generalizes the convergence of sequences. First, a sequence $(x_n)_{n\in\mathbb{N}}$ gives rise to a filter base: letting
$$T_n = \{ x_m \mid m \ge n\},$$
then $\mathcal{B} = \{ T_n \mid n \in \mathbb N \}$ is a filter base. That $\mathcal{B}$ converges to a point $p$ means that for each neighborhood $U$ of $p$, there is some $n$ such that $U \supset T_n$. This is the same as saying that the sequence $(x_n)_{n\in\mathbb{N}}$ converges to $p$.

Many standard topological properties can be stated using convergence of filter bases. For example:

- Given a subset $E \subset X$, a point $p$ is in the closure $\overline{E}$ of $E$ if and only if there is a filter base $\mathcal{B}$ on $E$ converging to $p$.
- A function $f : X \to Y$ between spaces is continuous at a point $a$ if and only if for each filter base $\mathcal{B}$ converging to $a$, the filter base $f(\mathcal{B}) := \{ f(S) \mid S \in \mathcal{B} \}$ converges to $f(a)$.
  In fact, it is enough to use a neighborhood base: if $f(N(a))$ converges to $f(a)$, then $f$ is continuous at $a$.
- The space $X$ is a Hausdorff space if and only if each filter base converges to at most one point.

Closely related to convergence is the notion of a cluster point (also called an accumulation point). Given a filter base $\mathcal{B}$, each point in the intersection
$$\bigcap_{S \in \mathcal{B}} \overline{S}$$
is called a cluster point of $\mathcal{B}$. Equivalently, a point $p$ is a cluster point if $\mathcal{B} \cup N(p)$ has the finite intersection property where $N(p)$ is the neighborhood base at $p$. Thus,

$\{ \text{cluster points of } \mathcal{B} \} = \{ \text{limit points of } \mathcal{F} \mid \text{a filter }\mathcal{F} \supset \mathcal{B} \}.$

(On a first countable space, a cluster point of a sequence is exactly the limit point of some subsequence; thus, passing to larger filters is an analog of passing to subsequences.)

=== First countable spaces ===
For first countable spaces (meaning each point has a countable neighborhood base), sequences often suffice, in that filters capture no extra information about the topology.

A filter is called an elementary filter if it has a filter base of the form $\mathcal{B} = \{T_n \mid n\in\mathbb{N}\}$, where $T_n = \{ x_m \mid m \ge n \}$ for some sequence $(x_n)_{n\in\mathbb{N}}$.

Proposition—If a filter has a countable filter base, then it is the intersection of all elementary filters that contain it.

Proof: If $\mathcal{F}$ has a countable filter base $\mathcal{B}$, enumerate it as $\mathcal{B} = \{ B_n \mid n \in \mathbb{Z}_{> 0} \}$. Then $\mathcal{F}$ is also generated by $\{ B_1 \cap \cdots \cap B_n \mid n \}$, so one can assume that $B_1 \supset B_2 \supset \cdots$. Using the notation of the definition of elementary filter, $B_n = \cup_{\mathcal{B}'} T_n$, where $\mathcal{B'}$ runs over all filter bases determined by sequences $x_j \in B_j, \, j\in\mathbb{N}$. Then
$$\mathcal{F}_\mathcal{B} = \cap_{\mathcal{B}'} \mathcal{F}_{\mathcal{B}'}$$
and the intersection in the claim lies between these two sets. $\square$

The proof above implies that to show a filter base of the form $B_1 \supset B_2 \supset \cdots$ converges to a point, it is necessary and sufficient that every sequence $x_n \in B_n$ converges to that point.

Here is a similar result: let $\mathcal{B}$ be a filter base of the form $B_1 \supset B_2 \supset \cdots$ on a first countable space $X$. Then a point $p$ is a cluster point of $\mathcal{B}$ if and only if there is a sequence $x_n \in B_n$ converging to $p$. As a corollary, for a first countable space, a cluster point of a sequence is the same as a limit of some subsequence.

== Compact spaces ==
One important feature of filters is a characterization of compactness that generalizes the standard sequential characterization in real analysis.

By definition, an ultrafilter is a maximal element in the set of all filters on a set $X$. Equivalently, a family $\mathfrak F$ of subsets of $X$ is an ultrafilter if and only if (1) it has the finite intersection property and (2) for some finitely many subsets $S_1, \dots, S_n$ of $X$, we have

$$\cup_1^n S_i \in \mathfrak{F} \Rightarrow S_i \in \mathfrak{F}$$

for some $i$. (Note the condition (2) is analogous to the definition of a prime ideal.)

Zorn's lemma implies that any filter is contained in some ultrafilter.

Restating the definition of compactness in terms of closed sets, we have a space $X$ is compact if and only if each family of closed subsets with the finite intersection property (FIP) has nonempty intersection.

For example, if $\mathcal{E} = \{ \overline{S} \mid S \in \mathcal{M} \}$ for an ultrafilter $\mathcal{M}$, then
$$\cap \mathcal{E} = \{ \text{limit points of } \mathcal{M} \}$$
since $p \in \cap \mathcal{E} \Leftrightarrow \mathcal{M} \cup N(p) \text{ has FIP} \Leftrightarrow \mathcal{M} \supset \mathcal{M} \cup N(p)$ by maximality. Conversely, every family $\mathcal{E}$ of closed sets with FIP is contained in an ultrafilter and the limit points of that ultrafilter lie in $\cap \mathcal{E}$.

From the above discussion follows the characterization of compactness in terms of filters:

Theorem—A space $X$ is compact if and only if each ultrafilter on it converges.

=== Tychonoff's theorem ===
(Tychonoff's theorem) An arbitrary product of compact spaces is compact.

This fundamental result of topology follows immediately from the above ultrafilter characterization of compact spaces together with the following general facts:

1. If $\mathcal{F}$ is an ultrafilter and $h : X \to Y$ a function, then $h(\mathcal{F})$ is a base for an ultrafilter.
2. Suppose the topology on $X$ is the initial topology with respect to a family of functions $h_i : X \to Y, i \in I$. Then a filter $\mathcal{F}$ converges to $x$ if and only if $h_i(\mathcal{F})$ converges to $h_i(x)$ for each $i \in I$. (This in fact characterizes initial topology; see § Topologies induced by filters below.)

=== Quasi-components ===
There is also the following characterization of compactness in terms of filter bases.

Proposition—For a topological space $X$, the following are equivalent:

1. $X$ is compact.
2. Each filter base on $X$ admits a cluster point.
3. For each filter base $\mathcal B$ on $X$, if an open set $U \supset \{ \text{cluster points of } \mathcal{B} \}$, then $U$ contains a set in $\mathcal{B}$.

The above can then be used to prove:

- if $X$ is a compact Hausdorff space, then each quasi-component in $X$ is connected, where the quasi-component of a point $x$ is the intersection of all clopen sets containing $x$.

Indeed, first of all, all the clopen sets containing a given point form a filter base $\mathcal B$ and the set of cluster points of $\mathcal B$ is exactly the quasi-component $Q$ of the point. Now, if $Q = F \cup G$ is a union of disjoint nonempty closed sets, then apply the above proposition to the union of some disjoint neighborhoods of $F, G$, which exist by normality; a contradiction follows readily.

== Compactifications and completions ==
=== Stone–Čech compactification ===
For each Tychonoff space $X$, there is a compact Hausdorff space $\beta X$ called its Stone–Čech compactification. This space contains a copy of $X$ as a dense subspace, and is universal in that every continuous map from $X$ to a compact space can be extended to a continuous map from $\beta X$ to the same compact space. Stone–Čech compactifications, especially that of $\mathbb{N}$ with the discrete topology, are an important topic of research in general topology.

The points of $\beta \mathbb{N}$ are the ultrafilters on $\mathbb{N}$, and the sets of the form
$$A' := \{\mathcal{F} \in \beta\mathbb{N} \mid A\in\mathcal{F}\},$$
where $A$ is any subset of $\mathbb{N}$, are a basis for its topology. There is an analogous construction, using filters, of $\beta X$ for any Tychonoff space $X$.

=== Cauchy filters and uniform spaces ===
A Cauchy filter is a filter analog of a Cauchy sequence. On a metric space, by definition, a filter $\mathcal{F}$ is Cauchy if for each $\epsilon > 0$, there is a set $A$ of diameter $< \epsilon$ in $\mathcal{F}$. For example, on a metric space $X$,

- A convergent filter is Cauchy.
- The filter determined by a sequence is Cauchy if and only if the sequence is Cauchy.
- Every ultrafilter on $X$ is Cauchy if for each $\epsilon > 0$, $X$ is covered by a finite number of open balls of diameter $< \epsilon$; i.e., it is totally bounded.

Cauchy filters generalize to uniform spaces, which are sets equipped with the additional structure of a filter of entourages, subsets of $X\times X$ satisfying certain properties. A filter $\mathcal{F}$ on a uniform space $X$ is a Cauchy filter if for each entourage $V$, there is a set $A$ in $\mathcal{F}$ such that $A \times A \subset V$. Cauchy filters can be used to construct a completion $\overline{X}$ of any uniform space—that is, a uniform space containing it in which every Cauchy filter converges—called its Hausdorff completion. The underlying set is the set of minimal Cauchy filters.

== Uniform convergence ==
The notions of pointwise convergence and uniform convergence in real analysis also generalize to filters.

Let $Y$ be a metric space (or more generally, a uniform space) and write $F(A, Y)$ for the set of all maps $A \to Y$ for a set $A$.

Note $F(A, Y) = \prod_{a \in A} Y$. Then with respect to the product topology, a filter $\mathcal{F}$ on $F(A, Y)$ converges to a map $u$ if and only if $p_a(F)$ converges to $p_a(u) = u(a)$ for each projection $p_a$; in such a case, $\mathcal F$ is said to converge pointwise to $u$.

Now, a filter $\mathcal{F}$ on $F(A, Y)$ is said to converge uniformly to a map $u$ if for each $\epsilon > 0$, $\mathcal F$ contains

$$\{ f : A \to Y \mid d(f(x), u(x)) < \epsilon, \, x \in A \},$$

when $Y$ is a metric space (and use an analogous condition in terms of entourages if $Y$ is a general uniform space). Filter bases converge uniformly or pointwise if the filters generated by them do so.

Equivalently, $\mathcal{F}$ converges uniformly to $u$ if and only if (1) it is a Cauchy filter in the sense like above and (2) it converges pointwise to $u$.

Uniform convergence can then be used just as in real analysis. For example, we have:

- Let $X$ be a compactly generated Hausdorff space (e.g., a locally compact space or a first countable Hausdorff space), $\mathcal B$ a filter base on $C(X, Y)$ and $u : X \to Y$ a map. If $p_A(\mathcal B)$ converges uniformly to $p_A(\mathcal B) = u|_A$ for each restriction map $p_A$ to a compact set $A$, then $u$ is continuous.

== Nets and filters ==
Nets provide another way to generalize sequences, and are used more commonly than filters in certain areas of research (especially real analysis).

A sequence $(x_n)_{n\in\mathbb{N}}$ on a space $X$ is the same as a map from $\mathbb{N}$ to $X$, sending each $n$ to $x_n$. The notion of a net is obtained by replacing $\mathbb{N}$ in this scenario with a more general directed set. Explicitly, a net on a space $X$ is a map $I \to X$ with domain a nonempty set $I$ equipped with binary relation $\lesssim$, which is a preorder and under which every finite subset of $I$ has an upper bound. Like a sequence, a net may be written $(x_\alpha)_{\alpha\in I}$, or even just $x_{\alpha}$ where $x_{\alpha}$ is the image of $\alpha \in I$.

Each net $(x_{\alpha})_{\alpha\in I}$ determines a filter base and vice-versa; this correspondence gives rise to the equivalence between these two generalizations of sequences. Given a net $(x_\alpha)_{\alpha\in I}$, let
$$T_{\alpha} = \{ x_{\beta} \mid \beta \gtrsim \alpha \}.$$
Then $\mathcal{B} = \{T_\alpha \mid \alpha\in I\}$ is the filter base determined by the net $(x_{\alpha})_{\alpha\in I}$. The convergence of nets is defined in the article on nets, and under this definition, $(x_\alpha)_{\alpha\in I}$ converges to a point $p$ if and only if the filter base $\mathcal{B}$ determined by it converges to $p$.

Conversely, given a filter base $\mathcal{B}$, let $J = \{ (a, x) \mid a \in \mathcal{B}, \, x \in a \}$. Define the binary relation $\lesssim$ on $J$ by
$$(a, x) \lesssim (b, y) \Leftrightarrow a \supset b.$$
Then the projection
$$u:J \to X, \, (a, x) \mapsto x,$$
as a function from the directed set $J$ to $X$, is the net determined by $\mathcal{B}$; the filter base $\mathcal{B}$ converges to a point $p\in X$ if and only if $u$ converges to $p$.

For example, if $u : J \to X$ is the net associated to a filter $\mathfrak F$, then the filter base determined by it is the original filter $\mathfrak F$. In particular, every filter is a filter associated to a net.

Because the respective notions of convergence based on nets and filters are equivalent as described above, characterizations of topological properties using filters can always be restated in terms of nets. For example:

Theorem—A space $X$ is compact if and only if each net has a cluster point, where a cluster point of a net $x_{\alpha}$ is a point in $\cap_{\alpha} \overline{\{ x_{\beta} \mid \beta \ge \alpha \}}$.

== Topologies induced by filters ==
A topology on a given set can be defined in several ways (in terms of open sets, by specifying a closure operator, etc.) Filters give another way to define a topology. Namely, for a set $X$ and each $x$ in $X$, let $\mathfrak{f}_x$ be a set of filters on $X$. Let $\tau(\mathfrak f)$ be the set of all subsets $U \subset X$ such that if $x \in U$, then $U \in \mathcal{F}$ for each $\mathcal{F} \in \mathfrak{f}_x$. Then $\tau(\mathfrak f)$ is a topology. For example, when $X$ is a topological space to begin with and $\mathfrak{f}_x$ is the set of all filters converging to $x$, this construction returns the original topology.

If the topology on $X$ is the initial topology $\tau_0$ for a family of functions $f_i : X \to Y_i, i \in I$, then letting
$$\mathfrak{f}_x = \{ \mathcal{F} \text{ a filter} \mid f_i(\mathcal{F}) \to f_i(x), i \in I \},$$
it follows that $\tau_0 = \tau(\mathfrak{f})$ since $\mathfrak{f}_x$ coincides with the set of filters converging to $x$. So the product topology, which is initial with respect to the projection maps, is the topology given by pointwise convergence of filters.

Given a family of filters $\mathfrak{f}$, it is not necessarily true that there is a topology $\tau$ such that $\mathfrak{f}_x$ is exactly the set of filters converging to $x$: filters in $\mathfrak{f}_x$ converge to $x$ with respect to $\tau(\mathfrak{f})$, but there may be additional convergent filters. One example occurs in the theory of function spaces (cf. Function space § Exponential law). This led some authors to enlarge the category of topological spaces by replacing a topology (= set of open sets) with a certain family of filters called a convergence structure. Such generalizations of topological spaces are also studied in categorical topology.
