= Singleton (mathematics) =

Set with exactly one element

In mathematics, a singleton (also known as a unit set or one-point set) is a set with exactly one element. For example, the set $\{0\}$ is a singleton whose single element is $0$. It is equivalent to a tuple with only one element, a 1-tuple, as it is unaffected by order.

== Properties ==
Within the framework of Zermelo–Fraenkel set theory, the axiom of regularity guarantees that no set is an element of itself. This implies that a singleton is necessarily distinct from the element it contains, thus 1 and $\{1\}$ are not the same thing, and the empty set is distinct from the set containing only the empty set. A set such as $\{\{1, 2, 3\}\}$ is a singleton as it contains a single element (which itself is a set, but not a singleton).

A set is a singleton if and only if its cardinality is 1. In von Neumann's set-theoretic construction of the natural numbers, the number 1 is defined as the singleton $\{0\}.$

In axiomatic set theory, the existence of singletons is a consequence of the axiom of pairing: for any set A, the axiom applied to A and A asserts the existence of $\{A, A\},$ which is the same as the singleton $\{A\}$ (since it contains A, and no other set, as an element).

If A is any set and S is any singleton, then there exists precisely one function from A to S, the function sending every element of A to the single element of S. Thus every singleton is a terminal object in the category of sets.

A singleton has the property that every function from it to any arbitrary set is injective. The only non-singleton set with this property is the empty set.

Every singleton set is an ultra prefilter. If $X$ is a set and $x \in X$ then the upward of $\{x\}$ in $X,$ which is the set $\{S \subseteq X : x \in S\},$ is a principal ultrafilter on $X$. Moreover, every principal ultrafilter on $X$ is necessarily of this form. The ultrafilter lemma implies that non-principal ultrafilters exist on every infinite set (these are called free ultrafilters). Every net valued in a singleton subset $X$ of is an ultranet in $X.$

The Bell number integer sequence counts the number of partitions of a set (OEIS: A000110), if singletons are excluded then the numbers are smaller (OEIS: A000296).

== In category theory ==
Structures built on singletons often serve as terminal objects or zero objects of various categories:

- The statement above shows that the singleton sets are precisely the terminal objects in the category Set of sets. No other sets are terminal.
- Any singleton admits a unique topological space structure (both subsets are open). These singleton topological spaces are terminal objects in the category of topological spaces and continuous functions. No other spaces are terminal in that category.
- Any singleton admits a unique group structure (the unique element serving as identity element). These singleton groups are zero objects in the category of groups and group homomorphisms. No other groups are terminal in that category.

== Definition by indicator functions ==
Let S be a class defined by an indicator function
$$b : X \to \{0, 1\}.$$
Then S is called a singleton if and only if there is some $y \in X$ such that for all $x \in X,$
$$b(x) = (x = y).$$

== Definition in Principia Mathematica ==
The following definition was introduced in Principia Mathematica by Whitehead and Russell:

$\iota$‘$x = \hat{y}(y = x)$ Df.

The symbol $\iota$‘$x$ denotes the singleton $\{x\}$ and $\hat{y}(y = x)$ denotes the class of objects identical with $x$ i.e. $\{y : y=x\}$. This occurs as a definition in the introduction, which, in places, simplifies the argument in the main text, where it occurs as proposition 51.01 (p. 357 ibid.). The proposition is subsequently used to define the cardinal number 1 as

$1=\hat{\alpha}((\exists x)\alpha=\iota$‘$x)$ Df.

That is, 1 is the class of singletons. This is definition 52.01 (p. 363 ibid.)

== See also ==
- Class (set theory) – Collection of sets in mathematics that can be defined based on a property of its members
- Isolated point – Point of a subset S around which there are no other points of S
- Uniqueness quantification – Logical quantifier
- Urelement – Concept in set theory
