= Product topology =

Topology on Cartesian products of topological spaces

In topology and related areas of mathematics, a product space is the Cartesian product of a family of topological spaces equipped with a natural topology called the product topology. This topology differs from another, perhaps more natural-seeming, topology called the box topology, which can also be given to a product space and which agrees with the product topology when the product is over only finitely many spaces. However, the product topology is "correct" in that it makes the product space a categorical product of its factors, whereas the box topology is too fine; in that sense the product topology is the natural topology on the Cartesian product.

== Definition ==
Throughout, $I$ will be some non-empty index set and for every index $i \in I,$ let $X_i$ be a topological space. Denote the Cartesian product of the sets $X_i$ by

$$X := \prod X_{\bull} := \prod_{i \in I} X_i$$

and for every index $i \in I$, denote the $i$-th canonical projection by

$$\begin{align}
p_i :\ \prod_{j \in I} X_j &\to     X_i, \\[3mu]
(x_j)_{j \in I}     &\mapsto x_i. \\
\end{align}$$

The product topology, sometimes called the Tychonoff topology, on $\prod_{i \in I} X_i$ is defined to be the coarsest topology (that is, the topology with the fewest open sets) for which all the projections $p_i : \prod X_{\bull} \to X_i$ are continuous. It is the initial topology on $\prod_{i \in I} X_i$ with respect to the family of projections $\left\{p_i\mathbin{\big\vert} i \in I\right\}$. The Cartesian product $X := \prod_{i \in I} X_i$ endowed with the product topology is called the product space. The open sets in the product topology are the unions of (finitely many or infinitely many) sets of the form $\prod_{i \in I} U_i$, where each $U_i$ is open in $X_i$ and $U_i \neq X_i$ for only finitely many $i$. In particular, for a finite product (in particular, for the product of two topological spaces), the set of all Cartesian products between one basis element from each $X_i$ gives a basis for the product topology of $\prod_{i\in I} X_i$. That is, for a finite product, the set of all $\prod_{i \in I} U_i$, where each $U_i$ is an element of the (chosen) basis of $X_i$, is a basis for the product topology of $\prod_{i\in I} X_i$.

The product topology on $\prod_{i \in I} X_i$ is the topology generated by the sets of the form $p_i^{-1}\left(U\right)$, where $i \in I$ and $U$ is an open subset of $X_i$. A subset of $X$ is open if and only if it is the union of (possibly infinitely many) intersections of finitely many sets of the form $p_i^{-1}\left(U\right)$. The $p_i^{-1}\left(U\right)$'s are sometimes called open cylinders, and their intersections are cylinder sets.

The product topology is also called the topology of pointwise convergence because a sequence (or more generally, a net) in $\prod_{i \in I} X_i$ converges if and only if all its projections to the spaces $X_i$ converge. Explicitly, a sequence $s_{\bull} = \left(s_n\right)_{n=1}^{\infty}$ (respectively, a net $s_{\bull} = \left(s_a\right)_{a \in A}$) converges to a given point $x \in \prod_{i \in I} X_i$ if and only if $p_i\left(s_{\bull}\right) \to p_i(x)$ in $X_i$ for every index $i \in I$, where $p_i\left(s_{\bull}\right) := p_i \circ s_{\bull}$ denotes $\left(p_i\left(s_n\right)\right)_{n=1}^{\infty}$ (respectively, denotes $\left(p_i\left(s_a\right)\right)_{a \in A}$). In particular, if $X_i = \R$ for all $i$, then the Cartesian product is the space $\prod_{i \in I} \R = \R^I$ of all real-valued functions on $I$, and convergence in the product topology is the same as pointwise convergence of functions.

== Examples ==
If the real line $\R$ is endowed with its standard topology then the product topology on the product of $n$ copies of $\R$ is equal to the ordinary Euclidean topology on $\R^n.$ (Because $n$ is finite, this is also equivalent to the box topology on $\R^n.$)

The Cantor set is homeomorphic to the product of countably many copies of the discrete space $\{ 0, 1 \}$ and the space of irrational numbers is homeomorphic to the product of countably many copies of the natural numbers, where again each copy carries the discrete topology.

Several additional examples are given in the article on the initial topology.

== Properties ==
The set of Cartesian products between the open sets of the topologies of each $X_i$ forms a basis for what is called the box topology on $X.$ In general, the box topology is finer than the product topology, but for finite products they coincide.

The product space $X,$ together with the canonical projections, can be characterized by the following universal property: if $Y$ is a topological space, and for every $i \in I,$ $f_i : Y \to X_i$ is a continuous map, then there exists precisely one continuous map $f : Y \to X$ such that for each $i \in I$ the following diagram commutes:

This shows that the product space is a product in the category of topological spaces. It follows from the above universal property that a map $f : Y \to X$ is continuous if and only if $f_i = p_i \circ f$ is continuous for all $i \in I.$ In many cases it is easier to check that the component functions $f_i$ are continuous. Checking whether a map $X \to Y$ is continuous is usually more difficult; one tries to use the fact that the $p_i$ are continuous in some way.

In addition to being continuous, the canonical projections $p_i : X \to X_i$ are open maps. This means that any open subset of the product space remains open when projected down to the $X_i.$ The converse is not true: if $W$ is a subspace of the product space whose projections down to all the $X_i$ are open, then $W$ need not be open in $X$ (consider for instance $W = \R^2 \setminus (0, 1)^2.$) The canonical projections are not generally closed maps (consider for example the closed set $\left\{(x,y) \in \R^2 : xy = 1\right\},$ whose projections onto both axes are $\R \setminus \{0\}$).

Suppose $\prod_{i \in I} S_i$ is a product of arbitrary subsets, where $S_i \subseteq X_i$ for every $i \in I.$ If all $S_i$ are non-empty then $\prod_{i \in I} S_i$ is a closed subset of the product space $X$ if and only if every $S_i$ is a closed subset of $X_i.$ More generally, the closure of the product $\prod_{i \in I} S_i$ of arbitrary subsets in the product space $X$ is equal to the product of the closures:

$${\operatorname{Cl}_X}\Bigl(\prod_{i \in I} S_i\Bigr) = \prod_{i \in I} \bigl({\operatorname{Cl}_{X_i}} S_i\bigr).$$

Any product of Hausdorff spaces is again a Hausdorff space; this comes from a simple preservation of disjoint open neighborhoods under the inverse of canonical projections from $X_i$'s to $\prod_{i \in I} X_i$. This line of argument is used for showing that other topological invariants are preserved under the product topology.

Tychonoff's theorem, which is equivalent to the axiom of choice, states that any product of compact spaces is a compact space. A specialization of Tychonoff's theorem that requires only the ultrafilter lemma (and not the full strength of the axiom of choice) states that any product of compact Hausdorff spaces is a compact space.

If $z = \left(z_i\right)_{i \in I} \in X$ is fixed then the set

$$\left\{ x = \left(x_i\right)_{i \in I} \in X \mathbin{\big\vert} x_i = z_i \text{ for all but finitely many } i \right\}$$

is a dense subset of the product space $X$.

== Relation to other topological notions ==
Separation

- Every product of T_{0} spaces is T_{0}.
- Every product of T_{1} spaces is T_{1}.
- Every product of Hausdorff spaces is Hausdorff.
- Every product of regular spaces is regular.
- Every product of Tychonoff spaces is Tychonoff.
- A product of normal spaces need not be normal. An example of this is the product of the set X of ordinals less than the first uncountable ordinal and the set Y which is the union of X with $\omega_1$. Both spaces have the order topology and are normal, yet $X \times Y$ is not normal.

Compactness

- Every product of compact spaces is compact (Tychonoff's theorem).
- A product of locally compact spaces need not be locally compact. However, an arbitrary product of locally compact spaces where all but finitely many are compact is locally compact (This condition is sufficient and necessary).

Connectedness

- Every product of connected (resp. path-connected) spaces is connected (resp. path-connected).
- Every product of hereditarily disconnected spaces is hereditarily disconnected.

Metric spaces

- Every countable product of metric spaces is a metrizable space.

== Axiom of choice ==
One of many ways to express the axiom of choice is to say that it is equivalent to the statement that the Cartesian product of a collection of non-empty sets is non-empty. The proof that this is equivalent to the statement of the axiom in terms of choice functions is immediate: one needs only to pick an element from each set to find a representative in the product. Conversely, a representative of the product is a set which contains exactly one element from each component.

The axiom of choice occurs again in the study of (topological) product spaces; for example, Tychonoff's theorem on compact sets is a more complex and subtle example of a statement that requires the axiom of choice and is equivalent to it in its most general formulation, and shows why the product topology may be considered the more useful topology to put on a Cartesian product.

== See also ==
- Disjoint union (topology) – Mathematical term
- Final topology – Finest topology making some functions continuous
- Initial topology – Coarsest topology making certain functions continuous - Sometimes called the projective limit topology
- Inverse limit – Construction in category theory
- Pointwise convergence – Notion of convergence in mathematics
- Quotient space (topology) – Topological space construction
- Subspace (topology) – Inherited topology
- Weak topology – Mathematical concept
