= Filter on a set =

Family of subsets representing "large" sets

In mathematics, a filter on a set is a collection of nonempty subsets which is closed under taking supersets and finite intersections. An example of a filter is the collection of neighborhoods of a point in a topological space.

Filters were introduced by Henri Cartan in 1937 in the context of general topological spaces and were subsequently developed by Nicolas Bourbaki in their book Topologie Générale (first edition in 1940) as an alternative to the related notion of a net developed in 1922 by E. H. Moore and Herman L. Smith. They later found applications in many fields outside of topology, including set theory, mathematical logic, model theory (ultraproducts for example), abstract algebra, and others.

Filters on a set were later generalized to order filters. Specifically, a filter on a set $X$ is an order filter on the power set of $X$ ordered by inclusion.

The notion dual to a filter is an ideal. Ultrafilters are a particularly important subclass of filters.

== Definition ==
Given a set $X$, a filter $\mathcal{F}$ on $X$ is a set of subsets of $X$ such that:

- $\mathcal{F}$ is upwards-closed: If $A, B \subseteq X$ are such that $A \in \mathcal{F}$ and $A \subseteq B$ then $B \in \mathcal{F}$,
- $\mathcal{F}$ is closed under finite intersections: $X \in \mathcal{F}$, (Note: The intersection of zero subsets of $X$ is $X$ itself.), and if $A \in \mathcal{F}$ and $B \in \mathcal{F}$ then $A \cap B \in \mathcal{F}$.

A proper (or non-degenerate) filter is a filter which is proper as a subset of the powerset $\mathcal{P}(X)$ (i.e., the only improper filter is $\mathcal{P}(X)$, consisting of all possible subsets). By upwards-closure, a filter is proper if and only if it does not contain the empty set. Many authors adopt the convention that a filter must be proper by definition.

When $\mathcal{F}$ and $\mathcal{G}$ are two filters on the same set such that $\mathcal{F} \subseteq \mathcal{G}$ holds, $\mathcal{F}$ is said to be coarser than $\mathcal{G}$ (or a subfilter of $\mathcal{G}$) while $\mathcal{G}$ is said to be finer than $\mathcal{F}$ (or subordinate to $\mathcal{F}$ or a superfilter of $\mathcal{F}$).

== Examples ==
- The singleton set $\mathcal{F} = \{X\}$ is called the trivial or indiscrete filter on $X$.
- If $Y$ is a subset of $X$, the subsets of $X$ which are supersets of $Y$ form a principal filter.
- If $X$ is a topological space and $x \in X$, then the set of neighborhoods of $x$ is a filter on $X$, the neighborhood filter or vicinity filter of $x$.
- Many examples arise from various "largeness" conditions:
  - If $X$ is a set, the set of all cofinite subsets of $X$ (i.e., those sets whose complement in $X$ is finite) is a filter on $X$, the Fréchet filter (or cofinite filter).
  - Similarly, if $X$ is a set, the cocountable subsets of $X$ (those whose complement is countable) form a filter, the cocountable filter which is finer than the Fréchet filter. More generally, for any infinite cardinal $\kappa$, the subsets whose complement has cardinality at most $\kappa$ form a filter.
  - If $X$ is a metric space, e.g., $\R^n$, the co-bounded subsets of $X$ (those whose complement is bounded set) form a filter on $X$.
  - If $X$ is a complete measure space (e.g., $\R^n$ with the Lebesgue measure), the conull subsets of $X$, i.e., the subsets whose complement has measure zero, form a filter on $X$. (For a non-complete measure space, one can take the subsets which, while not necessarily measurable, are contained in a measurable subset of measure zero.)
  - Similarly, if $X$ is a measure space, the subsets whose complement is contained in a measurable subset of finite measure form a filter on $X$.
  - If $X$ is a topological space, the comeager subsets of $X$, i.e., those whose complement is meager, form a filter on $X$.
  - The subsets of $\mathbb{N}$ which have a natural density of 1 form a filter on $\mathbb{N}$.
- The club filter of a regular uncountable cardinal $\kappa$ is the filter of all sets containing a club subset of $\kappa$.
- If $(\mathcal{F}_i)_{i \in I}$ is a family of filters on $X$ and $\mathcal{J}$ is a filter on $I$ then $\bigcup_{A \in \mathcal{J}} \bigcap_{i \in A} \mathcal{F}_i$ is a filter on $X$ called Kowalsky's filter.

== Principal and free filters ==
The kernel of a filter $\mathcal{F}$ on $X$ is the intersection of all the subsets of $X$ in $\mathcal{F}$.

A filter $\mathcal{F}$ on $X$ is principal (or atomic) when it has a particularly simple form: it contains exactly the supersets of $Y$, for some fixed subset $Y \subseteq X$. When $Y = \varnothing$, this yields the improper filter. When $Y = \{y\}$ is a singleton, this filter (which consists of all subsets that contain $y$) is called the fundamental filter (or discrete filter) associated with $y$.

A filter $\mathcal{F}$ is principal if and only if the kernel of $\mathcal{F}$ is an element of $\mathcal{F}$, and when this is the case, $\mathcal{F}$ consists of the supersets of its kernel. On a finite set, every filter is principal (since the intersection defining the kernel is finite).

A filter is said to be free when it has empty kernel, otherwise it is fixed (and if $x$ is an element of the kernel, it is fixed by $x$). A filter on a set $X$ is free if and only if it contains the Fréchet filter on $X$.

Two filters $\mathcal{F}_1$ and $\mathcal{F}_2$ on $X$ mesh when every member of $\mathcal{F}_1$ intersects every member of $\mathcal{F}_2$. For every filter $\mathcal{F}$ on $X$, there exists a unique pair of filters $\mathcal{F}_f$ (the free part of $\mathcal{F}$) and $\mathcal{F}_p$ (the principal part of $\mathcal{F}$) on $X$ such that $\mathcal{F}_f$ is free, $\mathcal{F}_p$ is principal, $\mathcal{F}_f \cap \mathcal{F}_p = \mathcal{F}$, and $\mathcal{F}_p$ does not mesh with $\mathcal{F}_f$. The principal part $\mathcal{F}_p$ is the principal filter generated by the kernel of $\mathcal{F}$, and the free part $\mathcal{F}_f$ consists of elements of $\mathcal{F}$ with any number of elements from the kernel possibly removed.

A filter $\mathcal{F}$ is countably deep if the kernel of any countable subset of $\mathcal{F}$ belongs to $\mathcal{F}$.

== Correspondence with order filters ==
The concept of a filter on a set is a special case of the more general concept of a filter on a partially ordered set. By definition, a filter on a partially ordered set $P$ is a subset $\mathcal{F}$ of $P$ which is upwards-closed (if $x \in \mathcal{F}$ and $x \leq y$ then $y \in \mathcal{F}$) and downwards-directed (every finite subset of $\mathcal{F}$ has a lower bound in $\mathcal{F}$). A filter on a set $X$ is the same as a filter on the powerset $\mathcal{P}(X)$ ordered by inclusion. (Note: It is immediate that a filter on $X$ is an order filter on $\mathcal{P}(X)$. For the converse, let $\mathcal{F}$ be an order filter on $\mathcal{P}(X)$. It is upwards-closed by definition. We check closure under finite intersections. If $A_0, \dots, A_{n-1}$ is a finite family of subsets from $\mathcal{F}$, it has a lower bound in $\mathcal{F}$ by downwards-closure, which is some $B \in \mathcal{F}$ such that $B \subseteq A_0, \dots, B \subseteq A_{n-1}$. Then $B \subseteq A_0 \cap \dots \cap A_{n-1}$, hence $A_0 \cap \dots \cap A_{n-1} \in \mathcal{F}$ by upwards-closure.)

== Constructions of filters ==
=== Intersection of filters ===
If $(\mathcal{F}_i)_{i \in I}$ is a family of filters on $X$, its intersection $\bigcap_{i \in I} \mathcal{F}_i$ is a filter on $X$. The intersection is a greatest lower bound operation in the set of filters on $X$ partially ordered by inclusion, which endows the filters on $X$ with a complete lattice structure.

The intersection $\bigcap_{i \in I} \mathcal{F}_i$ consists of the subsets which can be written as $\bigcup_{i \in I} A_i$ where $A_i \in \mathcal{F}_i$ for each $i \in I$.

=== Filter generated by a family of subsets ===
Given a family of subsets $\mathcal{S} \subseteq \mathcal{P}(X)$, there exists a minimum filter on $X$ (in the sense of inclusion) which contains $\mathcal{S}$. It can be constructed as the intersection (greatest lower bound) of all filters on $X$ containing $\mathcal{S}$. This filter $\langle \mathcal{S} \rangle$ is called the filter generated by $\mathcal{S}$, and $\mathcal{S}$ is said to be a filter subbase of $\langle \mathcal{S} \rangle$.

The generated filter can also be described more explicitly: $\langle \mathcal{S} \rangle$ is obtained by closing $\mathcal{S}$ under finite intersections, then upwards, i.e., $\langle \mathcal{S} \rangle$ consists of the subsets $Y \subseteq X$ such that $A_0 \cap \dots \cap A_{n-1} \subseteq Y$ for some $A_0, \dots, A_{n-1} \in \mathcal{B}$.

Since these operations preserve the kernel, it follows that $\langle \mathcal{S} \rangle$ is a proper filter if and only if $\mathcal{S}$ has the finite intersection property: the intersection of a finite subfamily of $\mathcal{S}$ is non-empty.

In the complete lattice of filters on $X$ ordered by inclusion, the least upper bound of a family of filters $(\mathcal{F}_i)_{i \in I}$ is the filter generated by $\bigcup_{i \in I} \mathcal{F}_i$.

Two filters $\mathcal{F}_1$ and $\mathcal{F}_2$ on $X$ mesh if and only if $\langle \mathcal{F}_1 \cup \mathcal{F}_2 \rangle$ is proper.

=== Filter bases ===
Let $\mathcal{F}$ be a filter on $X$. A filter base of $\mathcal{F}$ is a family of subsets $\mathcal{B} \subseteq \mathcal{P}(X)$ such that $\mathcal{F}$ is the upwards closure of $\mathcal{B}$, i.e., $\mathcal{F}$ consists of those subsets $Y \subseteq X$ for which $A \subseteq Y$ for some $A \in \mathcal{B}$.

This upwards closure is a filter if and only if $\mathcal{B}$ is downwards-directed, i.e., $\mathcal{B}$ is non-empty and for all $A, B \in \mathcal{B}$ there exists $C \in \mathcal{B}$ such that $C \subseteq A \cap B$. When this is the case, $\mathcal{B}$ is also called a prefilter, and the upwards closure is also equal to the generated filter $\langle \mathcal{B} \rangle$. Hence, being a filter base of $\mathcal{F}$ is a stronger property than being a filter subbase of $\mathcal{F}$.

==== Examples ====
- When $X$ is a topological space and $x \in X$, a filter base of the neighborhood filter of $x$ is known as a neighborhood base for $x$, and similarly, a filter subbase of the neighborhood filter of $x$ is known as a neighborhood subbase for $x$. The open neighborhoods of $x$ always form a neighborhood base for $x$, by definition of the neighborhood filter. In $X = \R^n$, the closed balls of positive radius around $x$ also form a neighborhood base for $x$.
- Let $X$ be an infinite set and let $\mathcal{F}$ consist of the subsets of $X$ which contain all points but one. Then $\mathcal{F}$ is a filter subbase of the Fréchet filter on $X$, which consists of the cofinite subsets. Its closure under finite intersections is the entire Fréchet filter, but there are smaller bases of the Fréchet filter which contain the subbase $\mathcal{F}$, such as the one formed by the subsets of $X$ which contain all points but a finite odd number. In fact, for every base of the Fréchet filter, removing any subset yields another base of the Fréchet filter.
- If $X$ is a topological space, the dense open subsets of $X$ form a filter base on $X$, because they are closed under finite intersection. The filter they generate consists of the complements of nowhere dense subsets. On $X = \R^n$, restricting to the null dense open subsets yields another filter base for the same filter.
- Similarly, if $X$ is a topological space, the countable intersections of dense open subsets form a filter base which generates the filter of comeager subsets.
- Let $X$ be a set and let $(x_i)_{i \in I}$ be a net with values in $X$, i.e., a family whose domain $I$ is a directed set. The filter base of tails of $(x_i)$ consists of the sets $\{x_j, j \geq i\}$ for $i \in I$; it is downwards-closed by directedness of $I$. The generated filter is called the eventuality filter or filter of tails of $(x_n)$. A sequential filter or elementary filter is a filter which is the eventuality filter of some net. This example is fundamental in the application of filters in topology.
- Every π-system is a filter base.

=== Trace of a filter on a subset ===
If $\mathcal{F}$ is a filter on $X$ and $Y \subseteq X$, the trace of $\mathcal{F}$ on $Y$ is $\{A \cap Y, A \in \mathcal{F}\}$, which is a filter.

=== Image of a filter by a function ===
Let $f : X \to Y$ be a function.

When $\mathcal{F}$ is a family of subsets of $X$, its image by $f$ is defined as

$$f(\mathcal{F}) = \{\{f(x), x \in A\}, A \in \mathcal{F}\}$$

The image filter by $f$ of a filter $\mathcal{F}$ on $X$ is defined as the generated filter $\langle f(\mathcal{F}) \rangle$. If $f$ is surjective, then $f(\mathcal{F})$ is already a filter. In the general case, $f(\mathcal{F})$ is a filter base and hence $\langle f(\mathcal{F}) \rangle$ is its upwards closure. Furthermore, if $\mathcal{B}$ is a filter base of $\mathcal{F}$ then $f(\mathcal{B})$ is a filter base of $\langle f(\mathcal{F}) \rangle$.

The kernels of $\mathcal{F}$ and $\langle f(\mathcal{F}) \rangle$ are linked by $f\left(\bigcap \mathcal{F}\right) \subseteq \bigcap \langle f(\mathcal{F}) \rangle$.

=== Product of filters ===
Given a family of sets $(X_i)_{i \in I}$ and a filter $\mathcal{F}_i$ on each $X_i$, the product filter $\prod_{i \in I} \mathcal{F}_i$ on the product set $\prod_{i \in I} X_i$ is defined as the filter generated by the sets $\pi_i^{-1}(A)$ for $i \in I$ and $A \in \mathcal{F}_i$, where $\pi_i : \left(\prod_{j \in I} X_j\right) \to X_i$ is the projection from the product set onto the $i$-th component. This construction is similar to the product topology.

If each $\mathcal{B}_i$ is a filter base on $\mathcal{F}_i$, a filter base of $\prod_{i \in I} \mathcal{F}_i$ is given by the sets $\prod_{i \in I} A_i$ where $(A_i)$ is a family such that $A_i \in \mathcal{F}_i$ for all $i \in I$ and $A_i = X_i$ for all but finitely many $i \in I$.

== See also ==
- Axiomatic foundations of topological spaces, for a definition of topological spaces in terms of filters
- Filters in topology – Application of set theory concept
- Convergence space, a generalization of topological spaces using filters
- Filter quantifier
- Ultrafilter – Maximal proper filter
- Generic filter, a kind of filter used in set-theoretic forcing

== Citations ==
Families $\mathcal{F}$ of sets over $\Omega$
| Is necessarily true of $\mathcal{F}\colon$ or, is $\mathcal{F}$ closed under: | Directed by $\,\supseteq$ | $A \cap B$ | $A \cup B$ | $B \setminus A$ | $\Omega \setminus A$ | $A_1 \cap A_2 \cap \cdots$ | $A_1 \cup A_2 \cup \cdots$ | $\Omega \in \mathcal{F}$ | $\varnothing \in \mathcal{F}$ | F.I.P. |
| π-system | Yes | Yes | No | No | No | No | No | No | No | No |
| Semiring | Yes | Yes | No | No | No | No | No | No | Yes | Never |
| Semialgebra (semifield) | Yes | Yes | No | No | No | No | No | No | Yes | Never |
| Monotone class | No | No | No | No | No | only if $A_i \searrow$ | only if $A_i \nearrow$ | No | No | No |
| 𝜆-system (Dynkin system) | Yes | No | No | only if $A \subseteq B$ | Yes | No | only if $A_i \nearrow$ or they are disjoint | Yes | Yes | Never |
| Ring (order theory) | Yes | Yes | Yes | No | No | No | No | No | No | No |
| Ring (measure theory) | Yes | Yes | Yes | Yes | No | No | No | No | Yes | Never |
| δ-ring | Yes | Yes | Yes | Yes | No | Yes | No | No | Yes | Never |
| 𝜎-ring | Yes | Yes | Yes | Yes | No | Yes | Yes | No | Yes | Never |
| Algebra (field) | Yes | Yes | Yes | Yes | Yes | No | No | Yes | Yes | Never |
| 𝜎-algebra (𝜎-field) | Yes | Yes | Yes | Yes | Yes | Yes | Yes | Yes | Yes | Never |
| Filter | Yes | Yes | Yes | No | No | No | Yes | Yes | No | No |
| Proper filter | Yes | Yes | Yes | Never | Never | No | Yes | Yes | Never | Yes |
| Prefilter (filter base) | Yes | No | No | No | No | No | No | No | No | Yes |
| Filter subbase | No | No | No | No | No | No | No | No | No | Yes |
| Open topology | Yes | Yes | Yes | No | No | No | (even arbitrary $\cup$) | Yes | Yes | Never |
| Closed topology | Yes | Yes | Yes | No | No | (even arbitrary $\cap$) | No | Yes | Yes | Never |
| Is necessarily true of $\mathcal{F}\colon$ or, is $\mathcal{F}$ closed under: | directed downward | finite intersections | finite unions | relative complements | complements in $\Omega$ | countable intersections | countable unions | contains $\Omega$ | contains $\varnothing$ | Finite intersection property |
Additionally, a semiring is a π-system where every complement $B \setminus A$ is equal to a finite disjoint union of sets in $\mathcal{F}.$ A semialgebra is a semiring where every complement $\Omega \setminus A$ is equal to a finite disjoint union of sets in $\mathcal{F}.$ $A, B, A_1, A_2, \ldots$ are arbitrary elements of $\mathcal{F}$ and it is assumed that $\mathcal{F} \neq \varnothing.$
