= Delta-ring =

Ring closed under countable intersections

In mathematics, a non-empty collection of sets $\mathcal{R}$ is called a δ-ring (pronounced "delta-ring") if it is closed under union, relative complementation, and countable intersection. The name "delta-ring" originates from the German word for intersection, "Durchschnitt", which is meant to highlight the ring's closure under countable intersection, in contrast to a 𝜎-ring which is closed under countable unions.

== Definition ==
A family of sets $\mathcal{R}$ is called a δ-ring if it has all of the following properties:

1. Closed under finite unions: $A \cup B \in \mathcal{R}$ for all $A, B \in \mathcal{R},$
2. Closed under relative complementation: $A - B \in \mathcal{R}$ for all $A, B \in \mathcal{R},$ and
3. Closed under countable intersections: $\bigcap_{n=1}^{\infty} A_n \in \mathcal{R}$ if $A_n \in \mathcal{R}$ for all $n \in \N.$

If only the first two properties are satisfied, then $\mathcal{R}$ is a ring of sets but not a δ-ring. Every 𝜎-ring is a δ-ring, but not every δ-ring is a 𝜎-ring.

δ-rings can be used instead of σ-algebras in the development of measure theory if one does not wish to allow sets of infinite measure.

== Examples ==
The family $\mathcal{K} = \{ S \subseteq \mathbb{R} : S \text{ is bounded} \}$ is a δ-ring but not a 𝜎-ring because $\bigcup_{n=1}^{\infty} [0, n]$ is not bounded.

== See also ==
- Field of sets – Algebraic concept in measure theory, also referred to as an algebra of sets
- 𝜆-system (Dynkin system) – Family closed under complements and countable disjoint unions
- Monotone class – Measure theory and probability theorem
- π-system – Family of sets closed under intersection
- Ring of sets – Family closed under unions and relative complements
- σ-algebra – Algebraic structure of set algebra
- 𝜎-ideal – Family closed under subsets and countable unions
- 𝜎-ring – Family of sets closed under countable unions

Families $\mathcal{F}$ of sets over $\Omega$
Is necessarily true of $\mathcal{F}\colon$ or, is $\mathcal{F}$ closed under:	Directed by $\,\supseteq$	$A \cap B$	$A \cup B$	$B \setminus A$	$\Omega \setminus A$	$A_1 \cap A_2 \cap \cdots$	$A_1 \cup A_2 \cup \cdots$	$\Omega \in \mathcal{F}$	$\varnothing \in \mathcal{F}$	F.I.P.
π-system	Yes	Yes	No	No	No	No	No	No	No	No
Semiring	Yes	Yes	No	No	No	No	No	No	Yes	Never
Semialgebra (semifield)	Yes	Yes	No	No	No	No	No	No	Yes	Never
Monotone class	No	No	No	No	No	only if $A_i \searrow$	only if $A_i \nearrow$	No	No	No
𝜆-system (Dynkin system)	Yes	No	No	only if $A \subseteq B$	Yes	No	only if $A_i \nearrow$ or they are disjoint	Yes	Yes	Never
Ring (order theory)	Yes	Yes	Yes	No	No	No	No	No	No	No
Ring (measure theory)	Yes	Yes	Yes	Yes	No	No	No	No	Yes	Never
δ-ring	Yes	Yes	Yes	Yes	No	Yes	No	No	Yes	Never
𝜎-ring	Yes	Yes	Yes	Yes	No	Yes	Yes	No	Yes	Never
Algebra (field)	Yes	Yes	Yes	Yes	Yes	No	No	Yes	Yes	Never
𝜎-algebra (𝜎-field)	Yes	Yes	Yes	Yes	Yes	Yes	Yes	Yes	Yes	Never
Filter	Yes	Yes	Yes	No	No	No	Yes	Yes	No	No
Proper filter	Yes	Yes	Yes	Never	Never	No	Yes	Yes	Never	Yes
Prefilter (filter base)	Yes	No	No	No	No	No	No	No	No	Yes
Filter subbase	No	No	No	No	No	No	No	No	No	Yes
Open topology	Yes	Yes	Yes	No	No	No	(even arbitrary $\cup$)	Yes	Yes	Never
Closed topology	Yes	Yes	Yes	No	No	(even arbitrary $\cap$)	No	Yes	Yes	Never
Is necessarily true of $\mathcal{F}\colon$ or, is $\mathcal{F}$ closed under:	directed downward	finite intersections	finite unions	relative complements	complements in $\Omega$	countable intersections	countable unions	contains $\Omega$	contains $\varnothing$	Finite intersection property
Additionally, a semiring is a π-system where every complement $B \setminus A$ is equal to a finite disjoint union of sets in $\mathcal{F}.$ A semialgebra is a semiring where every complement $\Omega \setminus A$ is equal to a finite disjoint union of sets in $\mathcal{F}.$ $A, B, A_1, A_2, \ldots$ are arbitrary elements of $\mathcal{F}$ and it is assumed that $\mathcal{F} \neq \varnothing.$
