= Finite intersection property =

Property in general topology

In general topology, a branch of mathematics, a family $\mathcal{A}$ of subsets of a set $X$ is said to have the finite intersection property (FIP) if any finite subfamily of $\mathcal{A}$ has non-empty intersection. It has the strong finite intersection property (SFIP) if any finite subfamily has infinite intersection. Sets with the finite intersection property are also called centered systems and filter subbases.

The finite intersection property can be used to reformulate topological compactness in terms of closed sets; this is its most prominent application. Other applications include proving that certain perfect sets are uncountable, and the construction of ultrafilters.

== Definition ==
Let $X$ be a set and $\mathcal{A}$ a family of subsets of $X$ (a subset of the power set of $X$). Then $\mathcal{A}$ is said to have the finite intersection property if the intersection of a finite number of subsets from $\mathcal{A}$ is always non-empty; it is said to have the strong finite intersection property if that intersection is always infinite.

In the study of filters in topology, the intersection of a family of sets is called its kernel. Families with empty kernel are called free; those with nonempty kernel, fixed.

== Examples and non-examples ==
The empty set cannot belong to any family with the finite intersection property.

If $\mathcal{A}$ has a non-empty kernel, then it has the finite intersection property trivially. The converse is false in general (although it holds trivially when $\mathcal{A}$ is finite). For example, the family of all cofinite subsets of a fixed infinite set — the Fréchet filter — has the finite intersection property, although its kernel is empty. More generally, any proper filter has the finite intersection property.

The finite intersection property is strictly stronger than requiring pairwise intersection to be non-empty, e.g., the family $\{\{1,2\}, \{2,3\}, \{1,3\}\}$ has non-empty pairwise intersections, but does not possess the finite intersection property. More generally, let $n$ be a natural number, let $X$ be a set with $n$ elements and let $\mathcal{A}$ consists of those subsets of $X$ that contain all elements but one. Then the intersection of fewer than $n$ subsets from $\mathcal{A}$ has non-empty intersection, but $\mathcal{A}$ lacks the finite intersection property.

=== End-type constructions ===
If $A_0 \supseteq A_1 \supseteq A_2 \cdots$ is a decreasing sequence of non-empty sets, then the family $\mathcal{A} = \left\{A_0, A_1, A_2, \ldots\right\}$ has the finite intersection property (and is even a π–system). If each $A_i$ is infinite, then $\mathcal{A}$ admits the strong finite intersection property as well.

More generally, any family of non-empty sets that is totally ordered by inclusion has the finite intersection property, and any family of infinite sets that is totally ordered by inclusion has the strong finite intersection property. At the same time, the kernel may be empty: consider the family of subsets $[a, +\infty)$ for $a \in \R$.

=== "Generic" sets and properties ===
The family of all Borel subsets of $[0, 1]$ with Lebesgue measure 1 has the finite intersection property, as does the family of comeagre sets.

If $X = (0, 1)$ and, for each positive integer $i$, the subset $X_i$ is precisely all elements of $X$ having digit $0$ in the $i$^{th} decimal place, then any finite intersection of $X_i$ is non-empty — just take $0$ in those finitely many places and $1$ in the rest. But the intersection of $X_i$ for all $i \geq 1$ is empty, since no element of $(0, 1)$ has all zero digits.

=== Generated filters and topologies ===
If $K \subseteq X$ is a non-empty set, then the family $\mathcal{A}=\{S \subseteq X : K \subseteq S\}$ has the FIP; this family is called the principal filter on $X$ generated by $K$. The subset $\mathcal{B} = \{I \subseteq \R : K \subseteq I \text{ and } I \text{ an open interval}\}$ has the FIP for much the same reason: the kernels contain the non-empty set $K$. If $K$ is an open interval, then the set $K$ is in fact equal to the kernels of $\mathcal{A}$ or $\mathcal{B}$, and so is an element of each filter. But in general a filter's kernel need not be an element of the filter.

A proper filter has the finite intersection property. Every neighbourhood subbasis at a point in a topological space has the FIP, and the same is true of every neighbourhood basis and every neighbourhood filter at a point (because each is, in particular, also a neighbourhood subbasis).

== Relationship to π-systems and filters ==
A π–system is a family of sets that is closed under finite intersections of one or more of its sets. For a family of sets $\mathcal A$, the family of sets
$$\pi(\mathcal{A}) = \left\{A_1 \cap \cdots \cap A_n : 1 \leq n < \infty \text{ and } A_1, \ldots, A_n \in \mathcal{A}\right\},$$
which is all finite intersections of one or more sets from $\mathcal{A}$, is called the π–system generated by $\mathcal{A}$, because it is the smallest π–system having $\mathcal{A}$ as a subset.

The upward closure of $\pi(\mathcal{A})$ in $X$ is the set
$$\pi(\mathcal{A})^{\uparrow X} = \left\{S \subseteq X : P \subseteq S \text{ for some } P \in \pi(\mathcal{A})\right\}\text{.}$$
For any family $\mathcal{A}$, the finite intersection property is equivalent to any of the following:

- The π–system generated by $\mathcal{A}$ does not have the empty set as an element; that is, $\varnothing \notin \pi(\mathcal{A}).$
- The set $\pi(\mathcal{A})$ has the finite intersection property.
- The set $\pi(\mathcal{A})$ is a (proper) prefilter.
- The family $\mathcal{A}$ is a subset of some (proper) prefilter.
- The upward closure $\pi(\mathcal{A})^{\uparrow X}$ is a (proper) filter on $X$. In this case, $\pi(\mathcal{A})^{\uparrow X}$ is called the filter on $X$ generated by $\mathcal{A}$, because it is the minimal (with respect to $\,\subseteq\,$) filter on $X$ that contains $\mathcal{A}$ as a subset.
- $\mathcal{A}$ is a subset of some (proper) filter.

== Applications ==
=== Compactness ===
The finite intersection property is useful in formulating an alternative definition of compactness:

Theorem—A space is compact if and only if every family of closed subsets having the finite intersection property has non-empty intersection.

This formulation of compactness is used in some proofs of Tychonoff's theorem.

=== Uncountability of perfect spaces ===
Another common application is to prove that the real numbers are uncountable. Note that a subset of a topological space is perfect if it is closed and has the property that no one-point subset is open.

Theorem—Let $X$ be a non-empty, perfect, compact Hausdorff space. Then $X$ is uncountable.

Examples of failures:

1. The theorem can fail without the Hausdorff condition; a countable set with at least two points and with the indiscrete topology is perfect and compact, but is not uncountable.
2. The theorem can fail without the compactness condition, as the set of rational numbers shows.
3. The theorem can fail without the perfect condition, as any finite space with the discrete topology shows.
Proof

For a proof by contradiction, suppose there exists a surjection, $f : \N \to X$, where $\N = \{1, 2, 3, \ldots\}$ is the set of natural numbers. Let $U_0 = X$. The set $U_0$ is non-empty and open. In the general step for $i \in \N$, we will choose a non-empty, open set $U_i \subseteq U_{i-1}$ whose closure does not contain $f(i)$. We note that $U_{i-1}$ contains at least two points because it is non-empty and open, and $X$ is perfect. Choose a point $y$ from $U_{i-1}$ that is different from $f(i)$. By the Hausdorff condition, choose disjoint open sets $V$ and $W$ that contain $y$ and $f(i)$, respectively. Then $U_i = U_{i-1} \cap V$ satisfies the desired requirements.

The collection $\left\{ U_i : i \in \N \right\}$ satisfies the finite intersection property and hence the intersection of their closures is non-empty by the compactness of $X$. Let $x$ be a point in this intersection. For any $i \in \N$, it cannot be the case that $x = f(i)$ because $f(i)$ does not belong to the closure of $U_i$ but $x$ does. That is, we have shown that $f$ is not a surjection; a contradiction. It must be that $X$ is uncountable.

Corollary—Every closed interval $[a, b]$ with $a < b$ is uncountable. Therefore, $\R$ is uncountable.

Corollary—Every perfect, locally compact Hausdorff space is uncountable.

Proof

If $X$ is also compact then the theorem immediately implies that $X$ is uncountable. If $X$ is not compact then the one-point compactification of $X$ is a perfect, compact Hausdorff space, and hence uncountable by the theorem. Since removing a single point from an uncountable set still leaves an uncountable set, $X$ is uncountable as well.

=== Ultrafilters ===
Let $X$ be non-empty, $F \subseteq 2^X.$ $F$ having the finite intersection property. Then there exists an $U$ ultrafilter (in $2^X$) such that $F \subseteq U.$ This result is known as the ultrafilter lemma.

== See also ==
- Filter on a set – Family of subsets representing "large" sets
- Filters in topology – Application of set theory concept
- Neighbourhood system – Concept in mathematics
- Ultrafilter on a set – Maximal proper filter
- Compact element- Generalization to lattices

Families $\mathcal{F}$ of sets over $\Omega$
Is necessarily true of $\mathcal{F}\colon$ or, is $\mathcal{F}$ closed under:	Directed by $\,\supseteq$	$A \cap B$	$A \cup B$	$B \setminus A$	$\Omega \setminus A$	$A_1 \cap A_2 \cap \cdots$	$A_1 \cup A_2 \cup \cdots$	$\Omega \in \mathcal{F}$	$\varnothing \in \mathcal{F}$	F.I.P.
π-system	Yes	Yes	No	No	No	No	No	No	No	No
Semiring	Yes	Yes	No	No	No	No	No	No	Yes	Never
Semialgebra (semifield)	Yes	Yes	No	No	No	No	No	No	Yes	Never
Monotone class	No	No	No	No	No	only if $A_i \searrow$	only if $A_i \nearrow$	No	No	No
𝜆-system (Dynkin system)	Yes	No	No	only if $A \subseteq B$	Yes	No	only if $A_i \nearrow$ or they are disjoint	Yes	Yes	Never
Ring (order theory)	Yes	Yes	Yes	No	No	No	No	No	No	No
Ring (measure theory)	Yes	Yes	Yes	Yes	No	No	No	No	Yes	Never
δ-ring	Yes	Yes	Yes	Yes	No	Yes	No	No	Yes	Never
𝜎-ring	Yes	Yes	Yes	Yes	No	Yes	Yes	No	Yes	Never
Algebra (field)	Yes	Yes	Yes	Yes	Yes	No	No	Yes	Yes	Never
𝜎-algebra (𝜎-field)	Yes	Yes	Yes	Yes	Yes	Yes	Yes	Yes	Yes	Never
Filter	Yes	Yes	Yes	No	No	No	Yes	Yes	No	No
Proper filter	Yes	Yes	Yes	Never	Never	No	Yes	Yes	Never	Yes
Prefilter (filter base)	Yes	No	No	No	No	No	No	No	No	Yes
Filter subbase	No	No	No	No	No	No	No	No	No	Yes
Open topology	Yes	Yes	Yes	No	No	No	(even arbitrary $\cup$)	Yes	Yes	Never
Closed topology	Yes	Yes	Yes	No	No	(even arbitrary $\cap$)	No	Yes	Yes	Never
Is necessarily true of $\mathcal{F}\colon$ or, is $\mathcal{F}$ closed under:	directed downward	finite intersections	finite unions	relative complements	complements in $\Omega$	countable intersections	countable unions	contains $\Omega$	contains $\varnothing$	Finite intersection property
Additionally, a semiring is a π-system where every complement $B \setminus A$ is equal to a finite disjoint union of sets in $\mathcal{F}.$ A semialgebra is a semiring where every complement $\Omega \setminus A$ is equal to a finite disjoint union of sets in $\mathcal{F}.$ $A, B, A_1, A_2, \ldots$ are arbitrary elements of $\mathcal{F}$ and it is assumed that $\mathcal{F} \neq \varnothing.$
