= Nodec space =

In topology and related areas of mathematics, a topological space $X$ is a nodec space if every nowhere dense subset of $X$ is closed. This concept was introduced and studied by van Douwen (1993).
