= Stone field =

Stonefield may refer to:

- Field of sets
- Blockfield
