= Ring of sets =

Family closed under unions and relative complements

In mathematics, there are two different notions of a ring of sets, both referring to certain families of sets.

In order theory, a nonempty family of sets $\mathcal{R}$ is called a ring (of sets) if it is closed under union and intersection. That is, the following two statements are true for all sets $A$ and $B$,

1. $A,B\in\mathcal{R}$ implies $A \cup B \in \mathcal{R}$ and
2. $A,B\in\mathcal{R}$ implies $A \cap B \in \mathcal{R}.$

In measure theory, a nonempty family of sets $\mathcal{R}$ is called a ring (of sets) if it is closed under union and relative complement (set-theoretic difference). That is, the following two statements are true for all sets $A$ and $B$,

1. $A, B \in \mathcal{R}$ implies $A \cup B \in \mathcal{R}$ and
2. $A, B \in \mathcal{R}$ implies $A \setminus B \in \mathcal{R}.$

This implies that a ring in the measure-theoretic sense always contains the empty set. Furthermore, for all sets A and B,

$$A\cap B=A\setminus(A\setminus B),$$

which shows that a family of sets closed under relative complement is also closed under intersection, so that a ring in the measure-theoretic sense is also a ring in the order-theoretic sense.

== Examples ==
If X is any set, then the power set of X (the family of all subsets of X) forms a ring of sets in either sense.

If (X, ≤) is a partially ordered set, then its upper sets (the subsets of X with the additional property that if x belongs to an upper set U and x ≤ y, then y must also belong to U) are closed under both intersections and unions. However, in general it will not be closed under differences of sets.

The open sets and closed sets of any topological space are closed under both unions and intersections.

On the real line R, the family of sets consisting of the empty set and all finite unions of half-open intervals of the form (a, b], with a, b ∈ R is a ring in the measure-theoretic sense.

If T is any transformation defined on a space, then the sets that are mapped into themselves by T are closed under both unions and intersections.

If two rings of sets are both defined on the same elements, then the sets that belong to both rings themselves form a ring of sets.

== Related structures ==
A ring of sets in the order-theoretic sense forms a distributive lattice in which the intersection and union operations correspond to the lattice's meet and join operations, respectively. Conversely, every distributive lattice is isomorphic to a ring of sets; in the case of finite distributive lattices, this is Birkhoff's representation theorem and the sets may be taken as the lower sets of a partially ordered set.

A family of sets closed under union and relative complement is also closed under symmetric difference and intersection. Conversely, every family of sets closed under both symmetric difference and intersection is also closed under union and relative complement. This is due to the identities

1. $A \cup B = (A\, \triangle\, B)\, \triangle\, (A \cap B)$ and
2. $A \setminus B = A\, \triangle\, (A \cap B).$

Symmetric difference and intersection together give a ring in the measure-theoretic sense the structure of a boolean ring.

In the measure-theoretic sense, a σ-ring is a ring closed under countable unions, and a δ-ring is a ring closed under countable intersections. Explicitly, a σ-ring over $X$ is a set $\mathcal{F}$ such that for any sequence $\{A_k\}_{k=1}^\infty \subseteq \mathcal{F},$ we have $\bigcup_{k=1}^\infty A_k \in \mathcal{F}.$

Given a set $X,$ a field of sets − also called an algebra over $X$ − is a ring that contains $X.$ This definition entails that an algebra is closed under absolute complement $A^c = X \setminus A.$ A σ-algebra is an algebra that is also closed under countable unions, or equivalently a σ-ring that contains $X.$ In fact, by de Morgan's laws, a δ-ring that contains $X$ is necessarily a σ-algebra as well. Fields of sets, and especially σ-algebras, are central to the modern theory of probability and the definition of measures.

A semiring (of sets) is a family of sets $\mathcal{S}$ with the properties

1. $\varnothing \in \mathcal{S},$
  - If (3) holds, then $\varnothing \in \mathcal{S}$ if and only if $\mathcal{S} \neq \varnothing.$
2. $A, B \in \mathcal{S}$ implies $A \cap B \in \mathcal{S},$ and
3. $A, B \in \mathcal{S}$ implies $A \setminus B = \bigcup_{i=1}^n C_i$ for some disjoint $C_1, \ldots, C_n \in \mathcal{S}.$

Every ring (in the measure theory sense) is a semi-ring. On the other hand, $\mathcal{S} := \{\emptyset,\{x\},\{y\}\}$ on $X = \{x,y\}$ is a semi-ring but not a ring, since it is not closed under unions.

A semialgebra or elementary family is a collection $\mathcal{S}$ of subsets of $X$ satisfying the semiring properties except with (3) replaced with:

- If $E \in \mathcal{S}$ then there exists a finite number of mutually disjoint sets $C_1, \ldots, C_n \in \mathcal{S}$ such that $X \setminus E = \bigcup_{i=1}^n C_i.$

This condition is stronger than (3), which can be seen as follows. If $\mathcal{S}$ is a semialgebra and $E, F \in \mathcal{S}$, then we can write $F^c = F_1 \cup \ldots \cup F_n$ for disjoint $F_i \in S$. Then:
$$E \setminus F = E \cap F^c = E \cap (F_1 \cup \ldots \cup F_n) = (E \cap F_1) \cup \ldots \cup (E \cap F_n)$$

and every $E \cap F_i \in S$ since it is closed under intersection, and disjoint since they are contained in the disjoint $F_i$'s. Moreover the condition is strictly stronger: any $S$ that is both a ring and a semialgebra is an algebra, hence any ring that is not an algebra is also not a semialgebra (e.g. the collection of finite sets on an infinite set $X$).

== See also ==
- Algebra of sets – Identities and relationships involving sets
- δ-ring – Ring closed under countable intersections
- Field of sets – Algebraic concept in measure theory, also referred to as an algebra of sets
- 𝜆-system (Dynkin system) – Family closed under complements and countable disjoint unions
- Monotone class – Measure theory and probability theorem
- π-system – Family of sets closed under intersection
- σ-algebra – Algebraic structure of set algebra
- 𝜎-ideal – Family closed under subsets and countable unions
- 𝜎-ring – Family of sets closed under countable unions

== Sources ==
- Durrett, Richard (2019). Probability: Theory and Examples (PDF). Cambridge Series in Statistical and Probabilistic Mathematics. Vol. 49 (5th ed.). Cambridge New York, NY: Cambridge University Press. ISBN 978-1-108-47368-2. OCLC 1100115281.
- Folland, Gerald B. (1999). Real Analysis: Modern Techniques and Their Applications (2nd ed.). John Wiley & Sons. ISBN 0-471-31716-0.

Families $\mathcal{F}$ of sets over $\Omega$
Is necessarily true of $\mathcal{F}\colon$ or, is $\mathcal{F}$ closed under:	Directed by $\,\supseteq$	$A \cap B$	$A \cup B$	$B \setminus A$	$\Omega \setminus A$	$A_1 \cap A_2 \cap \cdots$	$A_1 \cup A_2 \cup \cdots$	$\Omega \in \mathcal{F}$	$\varnothing \in \mathcal{F}$	F.I.P.
π-system	Yes	Yes	No	No	No	No	No	No	No	No
Semiring	Yes	Yes	No	No	No	No	No	No	Yes	Never
Semialgebra (semifield)	Yes	Yes	No	No	No	No	No	No	Yes	Never
Monotone class	No	No	No	No	No	only if $A_i \searrow$	only if $A_i \nearrow$	No	No	No
𝜆-system (Dynkin system)	Yes	No	No	only if $A \subseteq B$	Yes	No	only if $A_i \nearrow$ or they are disjoint	Yes	Yes	Never
Ring (order theory)	Yes	Yes	Yes	No	No	No	No	No	No	No
Ring (measure theory)	Yes	Yes	Yes	Yes	No	No	No	No	Yes	Never
δ-ring	Yes	Yes	Yes	Yes	No	Yes	No	No	Yes	Never
𝜎-ring	Yes	Yes	Yes	Yes	No	Yes	Yes	No	Yes	Never
Algebra (field)	Yes	Yes	Yes	Yes	Yes	No	No	Yes	Yes	Never
𝜎-algebra (𝜎-field)	Yes	Yes	Yes	Yes	Yes	Yes	Yes	Yes	Yes	Never
Filter	Yes	Yes	Yes	No	No	No	Yes	Yes	No	No
Proper filter	Yes	Yes	Yes	Never	Never	No	Yes	Yes	Never	Yes
Prefilter (filter base)	Yes	No	No	No	No	No	No	No	No	Yes
Filter subbase	No	No	No	No	No	No	No	No	No	Yes
Open topology	Yes	Yes	Yes	No	No	No	(even arbitrary $\cup$)	Yes	Yes	Never
Closed topology	Yes	Yes	Yes	No	No	(even arbitrary $\cap$)	No	Yes	Yes	Never
Is necessarily true of $\mathcal{F}\colon$ or, is $\mathcal{F}$ closed under:	directed downward	finite intersections	finite unions	relative complements	complements in $\Omega$	countable intersections	countable unions	contains $\Omega$	contains $\varnothing$	Finite intersection property
Additionally, a semiring is a π-system where every complement $B \setminus A$ is equal to a finite disjoint union of sets in $\mathcal{F}.$ A semialgebra is a semiring where every complement $\Omega \setminus A$ is equal to a finite disjoint union of sets in $\mathcal{F}.$ $A, B, A_1, A_2, \ldots$ are arbitrary elements of $\mathcal{F}$ and it is assumed that $\mathcal{F} \neq \varnothing.$
