= Sigma-ring =

Family of sets closed under countable unions

In mathematics, a nonempty collection of sets is called a 𝜎-ring (pronounced sigma-ring) if it is closed under countable union and relative complementation.

== Formal definition ==
Let $\mathcal{R}$ be a nonempty collection of sets. Then $\mathcal{R}$ is a 𝜎-ring if:

1. Closed under countable unions: $\bigcup_{n=1}^{\infty} A_{n} \in \mathcal{R}$ if $A_{n} \in \mathcal{R}$ for all $n \in \N$
2. Closed under relative complementation: $A \setminus B \in \mathcal{R}$ if $A, B \in \mathcal{R}$

== Properties ==
These two properties imply:
$$\bigcap_{n=1}^{\infty} A_n \in \mathcal{R}$$
whenever $A_1, A_2, \ldots$ are elements of $\mathcal{R}.$

This is because
$$\bigcap_{n=1}^\infty A_n = A_1 \setminus \bigcup_{n=2}^{\infty}\left(A_1 \setminus A_n\right).$$

Every 𝜎-ring is a δ-ring but there exist δ-rings that are not 𝜎-rings.

== Similar concepts ==
If the first property is weakened to closure under finite union (that is, $A \cup B \in \mathcal{R}$ whenever $A, B \in \mathcal{R}$) but not countable union, then $\mathcal{R}$ is a ring but not a 𝜎-ring.

== Uses ==
𝜎-rings can be used instead of 𝜎-fields (𝜎-algebras) in the development of measure and integration theory, if one does not wish to require that the universal set be measurable. Every 𝜎-field is also a 𝜎-ring, but a 𝜎-ring need not be a 𝜎-field.

A 𝜎-ring $\mathcal{R}$ that is a collection of subsets of $X$ induces a 𝜎-field for $X.$ Define $\mathcal{A} = \{ E \subseteq X : E \in \mathcal{R} \ \text{or} \ E^c \in \mathcal{R} \}.$ Then $\mathcal{A}$ is a 𝜎-field over the set $X$ - to check closure under countable union, recall a $\sigma$-ring is closed under countable intersections. In fact $\mathcal{A}$ is the minimal 𝜎-field containing $\mathcal{R}$ since it must be contained in every 𝜎-field containing $\mathcal{R}.$

== See also ==
- δ-ring – Ring closed under countable intersections
- Field of sets – Algebraic concept in measure theory, also referred to as an algebra of sets
- Join (sigma algebra) – Algebraic structure of set algebra
- 𝜆-system (Dynkin system) – Family closed under complements and countable disjoint unions
- Measurable function – Kind of mathematical function
- Monotone class – Measure theory and probability theorem
- π-system – Family of sets closed under intersection
- Ring of sets – Family closed under unions and relative complements
- Sample space – Set of all possible outcomes or results of a statistical trial or experiment
- 𝜎 additivity – Mapping function
- σ-algebra – Algebraic structure of set algebra
- 𝜎-ideal – Family closed under subsets and countable unions

Families $\mathcal{F}$ of sets over $\Omega$
| Is necessarily true of $\mathcal{F}\colon$ or, is $\mathcal{F}$ closed under: | Directed by $\,\supseteq$ | $A \cap B$ | $A \cup B$ | $B \setminus A$ | $\Omega \setminus A$ | $A_1 \cap A_2 \cap \cdots$ | $A_1 \cup A_2 \cup \cdots$ | $\Omega \in \mathcal{F}$ | $\varnothing \in \mathcal{F}$ | F.I.P. |
| π-system | Yes | Yes | No | No | No | No | No | No | No | No |
| Semiring | Yes | Yes | No | No | No | No | No | No | Yes | Never |
| Semialgebra (semifield) | Yes | Yes | No | No | No | No | No | No | Yes | Never |
| Monotone class | No | No | No | No | No | only if $A_i \searrow$ | only if $A_i \nearrow$ | No | No | No |
| 𝜆-system (Dynkin system) | Yes | No | No | only if $A \subseteq B$ | Yes | No | only if $A_i \nearrow$ or they are disjoint | Yes | Yes | Never |
| Ring (order theory) | Yes | Yes | Yes | No | No | No | No | No | No | No |
| Ring (measure theory) | Yes | Yes | Yes | Yes | No | No | No | No | Yes | Never |
| δ-ring | Yes | Yes | Yes | Yes | No | Yes | No | No | Yes | Never |
| 𝜎-ring | Yes | Yes | Yes | Yes | No | Yes | Yes | No | Yes | Never |
| Algebra (field) | Yes | Yes | Yes | Yes | Yes | No | No | Yes | Yes | Never |
| 𝜎-algebra (𝜎-field) | Yes | Yes | Yes | Yes | Yes | Yes | Yes | Yes | Yes | Never |
| Filter | Yes | Yes | Yes | No | No | No | Yes | Yes | No | No |
| Proper filter | Yes | Yes | Yes | Never | Never | No | Yes | Yes | Never | Yes |
| Prefilter (filter base) | Yes | No | No | No | No | No | No | No | No | Yes |
| Filter subbase | No | No | No | No | No | No | No | No | No | Yes |
| Open topology | Yes | Yes | Yes | No | No | No | (even arbitrary $\cup$) | Yes | Yes | Never |
| Closed topology | Yes | Yes | Yes | No | No | (even arbitrary $\cap$) | No | Yes | Yes | Never |
| Is necessarily true of $\mathcal{F}\colon$ or, is $\mathcal{F}$ closed under: | directed downward | finite intersections | finite unions | relative complements | complements in $\Omega$ | countable intersections | countable unions | contains $\Omega$ | contains $\varnothing$ | Finite intersection property |
Additionally, a semiring is a π-system where every complement $B \setminus A$ is equal to a finite disjoint union of sets in $\mathcal{F}.$ A semialgebra is a semiring where every complement $\Omega \setminus A$ is equal to a finite disjoint union of sets in $\mathcal{F}.$ $A, B, A_1, A_2, \ldots$ are arbitrary elements of $\mathcal{F}$ and it is assumed that $\mathcal{F} \neq \varnothing.$
