= Dynkin system =

Family closed under complements and countable disjoint unions

A Dynkin system, named after Eugene Dynkin, is a collection of subsets of another universal set $\Omega$ satisfying a set of axioms weaker than those of 𝜎-algebra. Dynkin systems are sometimes referred to as 𝜆-systems (Dynkin himself used this term) or d-system. These set families have applications in measure theory and probability.

A major application of 𝜆-systems is the π-𝜆 theorem, see below.

== Definition ==
Let $\Omega$ be a set, and let $D$ be a collection of subsets of $\Omega$ (that is, $D$ is a subset of the power set of $\Omega$). Then $D$ is a Dynkin system if

1. $\Omega \in D;$
2. $D$ is closed under complements of subsets in supersets: if $A, B \in D$ and $A \subseteq B,$ then $B \setminus A \in D;$
3. $D$ is closed under countable increasing unions: if $A_1 \subseteq A_2 \subseteq A_3 \subseteq \cdots$ is an increasing sequence (Note: A sequence of sets $A_1, A_2, A_3, \ldots$ is called increasing if $A_n \subseteq A_{n+1}$ for all $n \geq 1.$) of sets in $D$ then $\bigcup_{n=1}^\infty A_n \in D.$

It is easy to check (Note: Assume $\mathcal{D}$ satisfies (1), (2), and (3). Proof of (5): Property (5) follows from (1) and (2) by using $B := \Omega.$ The following lemma will be used to prove (6). Lemma: If $A, B \in \mathcal{D}$ are disjoint then $A \cup B \in \mathcal{D}.$ Proof of Lemma: $A \cap B = \varnothing$ implies $B \subseteq \Omega \setminus A,$ where $\Omega \setminus A \subseteq \Omega$ by (5). Now (2) implies that $\mathcal{D}$ contains $(\Omega \setminus A) \setminus B = \Omega \setminus (A \cup B)$ so that (5) guarantees that $A \cup B \in \mathcal{D},$ which proves the lemma. Proof of (6) Assume that $A_1, A_2, A_3, \ldots$ are pairwise disjoint sets in $\mathcal{D}.$ For every integer $n > 0,$ the lemma implies that $D_n := A_1 \cup \cdots \cup A_n \in \mathcal{D}$ where because $D_1 \subseteq D_2 \subseteq D_3 \subseteq \cdots$ is increasing, (3) guarantees that $\mathcal{D}$ contains their union $D_1 \cup D_2 \cup \cdots = A_1 \cup A_2 \cup \cdots,$ as desired. $\blacksquare$) that any Dynkin system $D$ satisfies:

4. $\varnothing \in D;$
5. $D$ is closed under complements in $\Omega$: if $A \in D,$ then $\Omega \setminus A \in D;$
  - Taking $A := \Omega$ shows that $\varnothing \in D.$
6. $D$ is closed under countable unions of pairwise disjoint sets: if $A_1, A_2, A_3, \ldots$ is a sequence of pairwise disjoint sets in $D$ (meaning that $A_i \cap A_j = \varnothing$ for all $i \neq j$) then $\bigcup_{n=1}^\infty A_n \in D.$
  - To be clear, this property also holds for finite sequences $A_1, \ldots, A_n$ of pairwise disjoint sets (by letting $A_i := \varnothing$ for all $i > n$).

Conversely, it is easy to check that a family of sets that satisfy conditions 4-6 is a Dynkin class. (Note: Assume $\mathcal{D}$ satisfies (4), (5), and (6). Proof of (2): If $A, B \in \mathcal{D}$ satisfy $A \subseteq B$ then (5) implies $\Omega \setminus B \in \mathcal{D}$ and since $(\Omega \setminus B) \cap A = \varnothing,$ (6) implies that $\mathcal{D}$ contains $(\Omega \setminus B) \cup A = \Omega \setminus (B \setminus A)$ so that finally (4) guarantees that $\Omega \setminus (\Omega \setminus (B \setminus A)) = B \setminus A$ is in $\mathcal{D}.$ Proof of (3): Assume $A_1 \subseteq A_2 \subseteq \cdots$ is an increasing sequence of subsets in $\mathcal{D},$ let $D_1 = A_1,$ and let $D_i = A_i \setminus A_{i-1}$ for every $i > 1,$ where (2) guarantees that $D_2, D_3, \ldots$ all belong to $\mathcal{D}.$ Since $D_1, D_2, D_3, \ldots$ are pairwise disjoint, (6) guarantees that their union $D_1 \cup D_2 \cup D_3 \cup \cdots = A_1 \cup A_2 \cup A_3 \cup \cdots$ belongs to $\mathcal{D},$ which proves (3).$\blacksquare$) For this reason, a small group of authors have adopted conditions 4-6 to define a Dynkin system.

An important fact is that any Dynkin system that is also a π-system (that is, closed under finite intersections) is a 𝜎-algebra. This can be verified by noting that conditions 2 and 3 together with closure under finite intersections imply closure under finite unions, which in turn implies closure under countable unions.

Given any collection $\mathcal{J}$ of subsets of $\Omega,$ there exists a unique Dynkin system denoted $D\{\mathcal{J}\}$ which is minimal with respect to containing $\mathcal J.$ That is, if $\tilde D$ is any Dynkin system containing $\mathcal{J},$ then $D\{\mathcal{J}\} \subseteq \tilde{D}.$ $D\{\mathcal{J}\}$ is called the Dynkin system generated by $\mathcal{J}.$ For instance, $D\{\varnothing\} = \{\varnothing, \Omega\}.$ For another example, let $\Omega = \{1,2,3,4\}$ and $\mathcal{J} = \{1\}$; then $D\{\mathcal{J}\} = \{\varnothing, \{1\}, \{2,3,4\}, \Omega\}.$

== Sierpiński–Dynkin's π-λ theorem ==
Sierpiński-Dynkin's π-𝜆 theorem: If $P$ is a π-system and $D$ is a Dynkin system with $P\subseteq D,$ then $\sigma\{P\}\subseteq D.$

In other words, the 𝜎-algebra generated by $P$ is contained in $D.$ Thus a Dynkin system contains a π-system if and only if it contains the 𝜎-algebra generated by that π-system.

One application of Sierpiński-Dynkin's π-𝜆 theorem is the uniqueness of a measure that evaluates the length of an interval (known as the Lebesgue measure):

Let $(\Omega, \mathcal{B}, \ell)$ be the unit interval [0,1] with the Lebesgue measure on Borel sets. Let $m$ be another measure on $\Omega$ satisfying $m[(a, b)] = b - a,$ and let $D$ be the family of sets $S$ such that $m[S] = \ell[S].$ Let $I := \{ (a, b), [a, b), (a, b], [a, b] : 0 < a \leq b < 1 \},$ and observe that $I$ is closed under finite intersections, that $I \subseteq D,$ and that $\mathcal{B}$ is the 𝜎-algebra generated by $I.$ It may be shown that $D$ satisfies the above conditions for a Dynkin-system. From Sierpiński-Dynkin's π-𝜆 Theorem it follows that $D$ in fact includes all of $\mathcal{B}$, which is equivalent to showing that the Lebesgue measure is unique on $\mathcal{B}$.

=== Application to probability distributions ===
The π-𝜆 theorem motivates the common definition of the probability distribution of a random variable $X : (\Omega, \mathcal F, \operatorname P) \to \Reals$ in terms of its cumulative distribution function. Recall that the cumulative distribution of a random variable is defined as
$$F_X(a) = \operatorname{P}[X \leq a], \qquad a \in \Reals,$$
whereas the seemingly more general law of the variable is the probability measure
$$\mathcal{L}_X(B) = \operatorname{P}\left[X^{-1}(B)\right] \quad \text{ for all } B \in \mathcal{B}(\Reals),$$
where $\mathcal{B}(\Reals)$ is the Borel 𝜎-algebra. The random variables $X :(\Omega, \mathcal F, \operatorname P) \to \Reals$ and $Y : (\tilde\Omega,\tilde{\mathcal F}, \tilde{\operatorname P}) \to \Reals$ (on two possibly different probability spaces) are equal in distribution (or law), denoted by $X \,\stackrel{\mathcal D}{=}\, Y,$ if they have the same cumulative distribution functions; that is, if $F_X = F_Y.$ The motivation for the definition stems from the observation that if $F_X = F_Y,$ then that is exactly to say that $\mathcal{L}_X$ and $\mathcal{L}_Y$ agree on the π-system $\{(-\infty, a] : a \in \Reals\}$ which generates $\mathcal{B}(\Reals),$ and so by the example above: $\mathcal{L}_X = \mathcal{L}_Y.$

A similar result holds for the joint distribution of a random vector. For example, suppose $X$ and $Y$ are two random variables defined on the same probability space $(\Omega, \mathcal{F}, \operatorname{P}),$ with respectively generated π-systems $\mathcal{I}_X$ and $\mathcal{I}_Y.$ The joint cumulative distribution function of $(X, Y)$ is
$$F_{X,Y}(a, b) = \operatorname{P}[X \leq a, Y \leq b]
= \operatorname{P}\left[X^{-1}((-\infty, a]) \cap Y^{-1}((-\infty, b])\right], \quad \text{ for all } a, b \in \Reals.$$

However, $A = X^{-1}((-\infty, a]) \in \mathcal{I}_X$ and $B = Y^{-1}((-\infty, b]) \in \mathcal{I}_Y.$ Because
$$\mathcal{I}_{X,Y} = \left\{A \cap B : A \in \mathcal{I}_X, \text{ and } B \in \mathcal{I}_Y\right\}$$
is a π-system generated by the random pair $(X, Y),$ the π-𝜆 theorem is used to show that the joint cumulative distribution function suffices to determine the joint law of $(X, Y).$ In other words, $(X, Y)$ and $(W, Z)$ have the same distribution if and only if they have the same joint cumulative distribution function.

In the theory of stochastic processes, two processes $(X_t)_{t \in T}, (Y_t)_{t \in T}$ are known to be equal in distribution if and only if they agree on all finite-dimensional distributions; that is, for all $t_1, \ldots, t_n \in T, \, n \in \N,$
$$\left(X_{t_1}, \ldots, X_{t_n}\right) \,\stackrel{\mathcal{D}}{=}\, \left(Y_{t_1}, \ldots, Y_{t_n}\right).$$

The proof of this is another application of the π-𝜆 theorem.

== See also ==
- Algebra of sets – Identities and relationships involving sets
- δ-ring – Ring closed under countable intersections
- Field of sets – Algebraic concept in measure theory, also referred to as an algebra of sets
- Monotone class – Measure theory and probability theorem
- π-system – Family of sets closed under intersection
- Ring of sets – Family closed under unions and relative complements
- σ-algebra – Algebraic structure of set algebra
- σ-ideal – Family closed under subsets and countable unions
- σ-ring – Family of sets closed under countable unions

== Notes ==
Families $\mathcal{F}$ of sets over $\Omega$
Is necessarily true of $\mathcal{F}\colon$ or, is $\mathcal{F}$ closed under:	Directed by $\,\supseteq$	$A \cap B$	$A \cup B$	$B \setminus A$	$\Omega \setminus A$	$A_1 \cap A_2 \cap \cdots$	$A_1 \cup A_2 \cup \cdots$	$\Omega \in \mathcal{F}$	$\varnothing \in \mathcal{F}$	F.I.P.
π-system	Yes	Yes	No	No	No	No	No	No	No	No
Semiring	Yes	Yes	No	No	No	No	No	No	Yes	Never
Semialgebra (semifield)	Yes	Yes	No	No	No	No	No	No	Yes	Never
Monotone class	No	No	No	No	No	only if $A_i \searrow$	only if $A_i \nearrow$	No	No	No
𝜆-system (Dynkin system)	Yes	No	No	only if $A \subseteq B$	Yes	No	only if $A_i \nearrow$ or they are disjoint	Yes	Yes	Never
Ring (order theory)	Yes	Yes	Yes	No	No	No	No	No	No	No
Ring (measure theory)	Yes	Yes	Yes	Yes	No	No	No	No	Yes	Never
δ-ring	Yes	Yes	Yes	Yes	No	Yes	No	No	Yes	Never
𝜎-ring	Yes	Yes	Yes	Yes	No	Yes	Yes	No	Yes	Never
Algebra (field)	Yes	Yes	Yes	Yes	Yes	No	No	Yes	Yes	Never
𝜎-algebra (𝜎-field)	Yes	Yes	Yes	Yes	Yes	Yes	Yes	Yes	Yes	Never
Filter	Yes	Yes	Yes	No	No	No	Yes	Yes	No	No
Proper filter	Yes	Yes	Yes	Never	Never	No	Yes	Yes	Never	Yes
Prefilter (filter base)	Yes	No	No	No	No	No	No	No	No	Yes
Filter subbase	No	No	No	No	No	No	No	No	No	Yes
Open topology	Yes	Yes	Yes	No	No	No	(even arbitrary $\cup$)	Yes	Yes	Never
Closed topology	Yes	Yes	Yes	No	No	(even arbitrary $\cap$)	No	Yes	Yes	Never
Is necessarily true of $\mathcal{F}\colon$ or, is $\mathcal{F}$ closed under:	directed downward	finite intersections	finite unions	relative complements	complements in $\Omega$	countable intersections	countable unions	contains $\Omega$	contains $\varnothing$	Finite intersection property
Additionally, a semiring is a π-system where every complement $B \setminus A$ is equal to a finite disjoint union of sets in $\mathcal{F}.$ A semialgebra is a semiring where every complement $\Omega \setminus A$ is equal to a finite disjoint union of sets in $\mathcal{F}.$ $A, B, A_1, A_2, \ldots$ are arbitrary elements of $\mathcal{F}$ and it is assumed that $\mathcal{F} \neq \varnothing.$
