= Complex algebra =

Complex algebra may refer to:

- A complex algebra (set theory), also known as field of sets
- Algebra over the complex numbers
- Algebra involving complex numbers
