= Negligible set =

Mathematical set regarded as insignificant

In mathematics, a negligible set is a set that is small enough that it can be ignored for some purpose. As common examples, finite sets can be ignored when studying the limit of a sequence, and null sets can be ignored when studying the integral of a measurable function.

Negligible sets define several useful concepts that can be applied in various situations, such as truth almost everywhere. In order for these to work, it is generally only necessary that the negligible sets form an ideal; that is, that the empty set be negligible, the union of two negligible sets be negligible, and any subset of a negligible set be negligible. For some purposes, we also need this ideal to be a sigma-ideal, so that countable unions of negligible sets are also negligible. If I and J are both ideals of subsets of the same set X, then one may speak of I-negligible and J-negligible subsets.

The opposite of a negligible set is a generic property, which has various forms.

== Examples ==
Let X be the set N of natural numbers, and let a subset of N be negligible if it is finite. Then the negligible sets form an ideal. This idea can be applied to any infinite set; but if applied to a finite set, every subset will be negligible, which is not a very useful notion.

Or let X be an uncountable set, and let a subset of X be negligible if it is countable. Then the negligible sets form a sigma-ideal.

Let X be a measurable space equipped with a measure m, and let a subset of X be negligible if it is m-null. Then the negligible sets form a sigma-ideal. Every sigma-ideal on X can be recovered in this way by placing a suitable measure on X, although the measure may be rather pathological.

Let X be the set R of real numbers, and let a subset A of R be negligible if for each ε > 0, there exists a finite or countable collection I_{1}, I_{2}, … of (possibly overlapping) intervals satisfying:

$$A \subset \bigcup_{k} I_k$$

and

$$\sum_{k} |I_k| < \epsilon .$$

This is a special case of the preceding example, using Lebesgue measure, but described in elementary terms.

Let X be a topological space, and let a subset be negligible if it is of first category, that is, if it is a countable union of nowhere-dense sets (where a set is nowhere-dense if it is not dense in any open set). Then the negligible sets form a sigma-ideal.

Let X be a directed set, and let a subset of X be negligible if it has an upper bound. Then the negligible sets form an ideal. The first example is a special case of this using the usual ordering of N.

In a coarse structure, the controlled sets are negligible.

== Derived concepts ==
Let X be a set, and let I be an ideal of negligible subsets of X. If p is a proposition about the elements of X, then p is true almost everywhere if the set of points where p is true is the complement of a negligible set. That is, p may not always be true, but it's false so rarely that this can be ignored for the purposes at hand.

If f and g are functions from X to the same space Y, then f and g are equivalent if they are equal almost everywhere. To make the introductory paragraph precise, then, let X be N, and let the negligible sets be the finite sets. Then f and g are sequences. If Y is a topological space, then f and g have the same limit, or both have none. (When you generalise this to a directed sets, you get the same result, but for nets.) Or, let X be a measure space, and let negligible sets be the null sets. If Y is the real line R, then either f and g have the same integral, or neither integral is defined.

== See also ==
- Negligible function
- Generic property
