= Sigma-ideal =

Family closed under subsets and countable unions

In mathematics, particularly measure theory, a 𝜎-ideal, or sigma ideal, of a σ-algebra (𝜎, read "sigma") is a subset with certain desirable closure properties. It is a special type of ideal. Its most frequent application is in probability theory.

Let $(X, \Sigma)$ be a measurable space (meaning $\Sigma$ is a 𝜎-algebra of subsets of $X$). A subset $N$ of $\Sigma$ is a 𝜎-ideal if the following properties are satisfied:

1. $\varnothing \in N$;
2. When $A \in N$ and $B \in \Sigma$ then $B \subseteq A$ implies $B \in N$;
3. If $\left\{A_n\right\}_{n \in \N} \subseteq N$ then $\bigcup_{n \in \N} A_n \in N.$

Briefly, a sigma-ideal must contain the empty set and contain measurable subsets and countable unions of its elements. The concept of 𝜎-ideal is dual to that of a countably complete (𝜎-) filter.

If a measure $\mu$ is given on $(X, \Sigma),$ the set of $\mu$-negligible sets ($S \in \Sigma$ such that $\mu(S) = 0$) is a 𝜎-ideal.

The notion can be generalized to preorders $(P, \leq, 0)$ with a bottom element $0$ as follows: $I$ is a 𝜎-ideal of $P$ just when

(i') $0 \in I,$

(ii') $x \leq y \text{ and } y \in I$ implies $x \in I,$ and

(iii') given a sequence $x_1, x_2, \ldots \in I,$ there exists some $y \in I$ such that $x_n \leq y$ for each $n.$

Thus $I$ contains the bottom element, is downward closed, and satisfies a countable analogue of the property of being upwards directed.

A 𝜎-ideal of a set $X$ is a 𝜎-ideal of the power set of $X.$ That is, when no 𝜎-algebra is specified, then one simply takes the full power set of the underlying set. For example, the meager subsets of a topological space are those in the 𝜎-ideal generated by the collection of closed subsets with empty interior.

== See also ==
- δ-ring – Ring closed under countable intersections
- Field of sets – Algebraic concept in measure theory, also referred to as an algebra of sets
- Join (sigma algebra) – Algebraic structure of set algebra
- 𝜆-system (Dynkin system) – Family closed under complements and countable disjoint unions
- Measurable function – Kind of mathematical function
- π-system – Family of sets closed under intersection
- Ring of sets – Family closed under unions and relative complements
- Sample space – Set of all possible outcomes or results of a statistical trial or experiment
- 𝜎-algebra – Algebraic structure of set algebra
- 𝜎-ring – Family of sets closed under countable unions
- Sigma additivity – Mapping function
