= Field of sets =

Algebraic concept in measure theory, also referred to as an algebra of sets

In mathematics, a field of sets is a mathematical structure consisting of a pair $( X, \mathcal{F} )$ consisting of a set $X$ and a family $\mathcal{F}$ of subsets of $X$ called an algebra over $X$ that contains the empty set as an element, and is closed under the operations of taking complements in $X,$ finite unions, and finite intersections.

Fields of sets should not be confused with fields in ring theory nor with fields in physics. Similarly the term "algebra over $X$" is used in the sense of a Boolean algebra and should not be confused with algebras over fields or rings in ring theory.

Fields of sets play an essential role in the representation theory of Boolean algebras. Every Boolean algebra can be represented as a field of sets.

== Definitions ==
A field of sets is a pair $( X, \mathcal{F} )$ consisting of a set $X$ and a family $\mathcal{F}$ of subsets of $X,$ called an algebra over $X,$ that has the following properties:

1. Closed under complementation in $X$:
  $$X \setminus F \in \mathcal{F} \text{ for all } F \in \mathcal{F}.$$
2. Contains the empty set (or contains $X$) as an element: $\varnothing \in \mathcal{F}.$
  - Assuming that (1) holds, this condition (2) is equivalent to: $X \in \mathcal{F}.$
3. Any of the following equivalent (Note: The listed statements are equivalent if (1) and (2) hold. The equivalence of statements (a) and (b) follows from De Morgan's laws. This is also true of the equivalence of statements (c) and (d).) conditions hold:
  1. Closed under binary unions:
    $$F \cup G \in \mathcal{F} \text{ for all } F, G \in \mathcal{F}.$$
  2. Closed under binary intersections:
    $$F \cap G \in \mathcal{F} \text{ for all } F, G \in \mathcal{F}.$$
  3. Closed under finite unions:
    $$F_1 \cup \cdots \cup F_n \in \mathcal{F} \text{ for all integers } n \geq 1 \text{ and all } F_1, \ldots, F_n \in \mathcal{F}.$$
  4. Closed under finite intersections:
    $$F_1 \cap \cdots \cap F_n \in \mathcal{F} \text{ for all integers } n \geq 1 \text{ and all } F_1, \ldots, F_n \in \mathcal{F}.$$

In other words, $\mathcal{F}$ forms a subalgebra of the power set Boolean algebra of $X$ (with the same identity element $X \in \mathcal{F}$). Many authors refer to $\mathcal{F}$ itself as a field of sets. Elements of $X$ are called points while elements of $\mathcal{F}$ are called complexes and are said to be the admissible sets of $X.$

A field of sets $( X, \mathcal{F} )$ is called a measurable space and the algebra $\mathcal{F}$ is called a σ-algebra if the following additional condition (4) is satisfied:

4. One of the following equivalent conditions holds:
  1. Closed under countable unions:
    $$\bigcup_{i=1}^{\infty} F_i := F_1 \cup F_2 \cup \cdots \in \mathcal{F}$$
    for all $F_1, F_2, \ldots \in \mathcal{F}.$
  2. Closed under countable intersections:
    $$\bigcap_{i=1}^{\infty} F_i := F_1 \cap F_2 \cap \cdots \in \mathcal{F}$$
    for all $F_1, F_2, \ldots \in \mathcal{F}.$

== Fields of sets in the representation theory of Boolean algebras ==
=== Stone representation ===
The pair $( Y, 2^Y )$ of an arbitrary set $Y$ and its power set $2^Y$ is a field of sets. If $Y$ is finite (namely, $n$-element), then $2^Y$ is finite (namely, $2^n$-element). It appears that every finite field of sets (it means, $( X, \mathcal{F} )$ with $\mathcal{F}$ finite, while $X$ may be infinite) admits a representation of the form $( Y, 2^Y )$ with finite $Y$; it means a function $f: X \to Y$ that establishes a one-to-one correspondence between $\mathcal{F}$ and $2^Y$ via inverse image: $S = f^{-1}[B] = \{x \in X \mid f(x)\in B \}$ where $S\in\mathcal{F}$ and $B \in 2^Y$ (that is, $B\subset Y$). One notable consequence: the number of complexes, if finite, is always of the form $2^n.$

To this end one chooses $Y$ to be the set of all atoms of the given field of sets, and defines $f$ by $f(x) = A$ whenever $x \in A$ for a point $x \in X$ and a complex $A \in \mathcal{F}$ that is an atom; the latter means that a nonempty subset of $A$ different from $A$ cannot be a complex.

In other words: the atoms are a partition of $X$; $Y$ is the corresponding quotient set; and $f$ is the corresponding canonical surjection.

Similarly, every finite Boolean algebra can be represented as a power set – the power set of its set of atoms; each element of the Boolean algebra corresponds to the set of atoms below it (the join of which is the element). This power set representation can be constructed more generally for any complete atomic Boolean algebra.

In the case of Boolean algebras which are not complete and atomic we can still generalize the power set representation by considering fields of sets instead of whole power sets. To do this we first observe that the atoms of a finite Boolean algebra correspond to its ultrafilters and that an atom is below an element of a finite Boolean algebra if and only if that element is contained in the ultrafilter corresponding to the atom. This leads us to construct a representation of a Boolean algebra by taking its set of ultrafilters and forming complexes by associating with each element of the Boolean algebra the set of ultrafilters containing that element. This construction does indeed produce a representation of the Boolean algebra as a field of sets and is known as the Stone representation. It is the basis of Stone's representation theorem for Boolean algebras and an example of a completion procedure in order theory based on ideals or filters, similar to Dedekind cuts.

Alternatively one can consider the set of homomorphisms onto the two element Boolean algebra and form complexes by associating each element of the Boolean algebra with the set of such homomorphisms that map it to the top element. (The approach is equivalent as the ultrafilters of a Boolean algebra are precisely the pre-images of the top elements under these homomorphisms.) With this approach one sees that Stone representation can also be regarded as a generalization of the representation of finite Boolean algebras by truth tables.

=== Separative and compact fields of sets: towards Stone duality ===
- A field of sets is called separative (or differentiated) if and only if for every pair of distinct points there is a complex containing one and not the other.
- A field of sets is called compact if and only if for every proper filter over $X$ the intersection of all the complexes contained in the filter is non-empty.

These definitions arise from considering the topology generated by the complexes of a field of sets. (It is just one of notable topologies on the given set of points; it often happens that another topology is given, with quite different properties, in particular, not zero-dimensional). Given a field of sets $\mathbf{X} = ( X, \mathcal{F} )$ the complexes form a base for a topology. We denote by $T(\mathbf{X})$ the corresponding topological space, $( X, \mathcal{T} )$ where $\mathcal{T}$ is the topology formed by taking arbitrary unions of complexes. Then

- $T(\mathbf{X})$ is always a zero-dimensional space.
- $T(\mathbf{X})$ is a Hausdorff space if and only if $\mathbf{X}$ is separative.
- $T(\mathbf{X})$ is a compact space with compact open sets $\mathcal{F}$ if and only if $\mathbf{X}$ is compact.
- $T(\mathbf{X})$ is a Boolean space with clopen sets $\mathcal{F}$ if and only if $\mathbf{X}$ is both separative and compact (in which case it is described as being descriptive)

The Stone representation of a Boolean algebra is always separative and compact; the corresponding Boolean space is known as the Stone space of the Boolean algebra. The clopen sets of the Stone space are then precisely the complexes of the Stone representation. The area of mathematics known as Stone duality is founded on the fact that the Stone representation of a Boolean algebra can be recovered purely from the corresponding Stone space whence a duality exists between Boolean algebras and Boolean spaces.

== Fields of sets with additional structure ==
=== Sigma algebras and measure spaces ===
If an algebra over a set is closed under countable unions (hence also under countable intersections), it is called a sigma algebra and the corresponding field of sets is called a measurable space. The complexes of a measurable space are called measurable sets. The Loomis-Sikorski theorem provides a Stone-type duality between countably complete Boolean algebras (which may be called abstract sigma algebras) and measurable spaces.

A measure space is a triple $( X, \mathcal{F}, \mu )$ where $( X, \mathcal{F} )$ is a measurable space and $\mu$ is a measure defined on it. If $\mu$ is in fact a probability measure we speak of a probability space and call its underlying measurable space a sample space. The points of a sample space are called sample points and represent potential outcomes while the measurable sets (complexes) are called events and represent properties of outcomes for which we wish to assign probabilities. (Many use the term sample space simply for the underlying set of a probability space, particularly in the case where every subset is an event.) Measure spaces and probability spaces play a foundational role in measure theory and probability theory respectively.

In applications to Physics we often deal with measure spaces and probability spaces derived from rich mathematical structures such as inner product spaces or topological groups which already have a topology associated with them - this should not be confused with the topology generated by taking arbitrary unions of complexes.

=== Topological fields of sets ===
A topological field of sets is a triple $( X, \mathcal{T}, \mathcal{F} )$ where $( X, \mathcal{T} )$ is a topological space and $( X, \mathcal{F} )$ is a field of sets which is closed under the closure operator of $\mathcal{T}$ or equivalently under the interior operator i.e. the closure and interior of every complex is also a complex. In other words, $\mathcal{F}$ forms a subalgebra of the power set interior algebra on $( X, \mathcal{T} ).$

Topological fields of sets play a fundamental role in the representation theory of interior algebras and Heyting algebras. These two classes of algebraic structures provide the algebraic semantics for the modal logic S4 (a formal mathematical abstraction of epistemic logic) and intuitionistic logic respectively. Topological fields of sets representing these algebraic structures provide a related topological semantics for these logics.

Every interior algebra can be represented as a topological field of sets with the underlying Boolean algebra of the interior algebra corresponding to the complexes of the topological field of sets and the interior and closure operators of the interior algebra corresponding to those of the topology. Every Heyting algebra can be represented by a topological field of sets with the underlying lattice of the Heyting algebra corresponding to the lattice of complexes of the topological field of sets that are open in the topology. Moreover the topological field of sets representing a Heyting algebra may be chosen so that the open complexes generate all the complexes as a Boolean algebra. These related representations provide a well defined mathematical apparatus for studying the relationship between truth modalities (possibly true vs necessarily true, studied in modal logic) and notions of provability and refutability (studied in intuitionistic logic) and is thus deeply connected to the theory of modal companions of intermediate logics.

Given a topological space the clopen sets trivially form a topological field of sets as each clopen set is its own interior and closure. The Stone representation of a Boolean algebra can be regarded as such a topological field of sets, however in general the topology of a topological field of sets can differ from the topology generated by taking arbitrary unions of complexes and in general the complexes of a topological field of sets need not be open or closed in the topology.

==== Algebraic fields of sets and Stone fields ====
A topological field of sets is called algebraic if and only if there is a base for its topology consisting of complexes.

If a topological field of sets is both compact and algebraic then its topology is compact and its compact open sets are precisely the open complexes. Moreover, the open complexes form a base for the topology.

Topological fields of sets that are separative, compact and algebraic are called Stone fields and provide a generalization of the Stone representation of Boolean algebras. Given an interior algebra we can form the Stone representation of its underlying Boolean algebra and then extend this to a topological field of sets by taking the topology generated by the complexes corresponding to the open elements of the interior algebra (which form a base for a topology). These complexes are then precisely the open complexes and the construction produces a Stone field representing the interior algebra - the Stone representation. (The topology of the Stone representation is also known as the McKinsey–Tarski Stone topology after the mathematicians who first generalized Stone's result for Boolean algebras to interior algebras and should not be confused with the Stone topology of the underlying Boolean algebra of the interior algebra which will be a finer topology).

=== Preorder fields ===
A preorder field is a triple $( X, \leq , \mathcal{F} )$ where $( X, \leq )$ is a preordered set and $( X, \mathcal{F} )$ is a field of sets.

Like the topological fields of sets, preorder fields play an important role in the representation theory of interior algebras. Every interior algebra can be represented as a preorder field with its interior and closure operators corresponding to those of the Alexandrov topology induced by the preorder. In other words, for all $S \in \mathcal{F}$:
$$\mathrm{Int}(S) = \{ x \in X : \text{ there exists a } y \in S \text{ with } y \leq x \}$$
and
$$\mathrm{Cl}(S)  = \{ x \in X : \text{ there exists a } y \in S \text{ with } x \leq y \}$$

Similarly to topological fields of sets, preorder fields arise naturally in modal logic where the points represent the possible worlds in the Kripke semantics of a theory in the modal logic S4, the preorder represents the accessibility relation on these possible worlds in this semantics, and the complexes represent sets of possible worlds in which individual sentences in the theory hold, providing a representation of the Lindenbaum–Tarski algebra of the theory. They are a special case of the general modal frames which are fields of sets with an additional accessibility relation providing representations of modal algebras.

==== Algebraic and canonical preorder fields ====
A preorder field is called algebraic (or tight) if and only if it has a set of complexes $\mathcal{A}$ which determines the preorder in the following manner: $x \leq y$ if and only if for every complex $S \in \mathcal{A}$, $x \in S$ implies $y \in S$. The preorder fields obtained from S4 theories are always algebraic, the complexes determining the preorder being the sets of possible worlds in which the sentences of the theory closed under necessity hold.

A separative compact algebraic preorder field is said to be canonical. Given an interior algebra, by replacing the topology of its Stone representation with the corresponding canonical preorder (specialization preorder) we obtain a representation of the interior algebra as a canonical preorder field. By replacing the preorder by its corresponding Alexandrov topology we obtain an alternative representation of the interior algebra as a topological field of sets. (The topology of this "Alexandrov representation" is just the Alexandrov bi-coreflection of the topology of the Stone representation.) While representation of modal algebras by general modal frames is possible for any normal modal algebra, it is only in the case of interior algebras (which correspond to the modal logic S4) that the general modal frame corresponds to topological field of sets in this manner.

=== Complex algebras and fields of sets on relational structures ===
The representation of interior algebras by preorder fields can be generalized to a representation theorem for arbitrary (normal) Boolean algebras with operators. For this we consider structures $( X, (R_i)_I, \mathcal{F} )$ where $( X,(R_i)_I )$ is a relational structure i.e. a set with an indexed family of relations defined on it, and $( X, \mathcal{F} )$ is a field of sets. The complex algebra (or algebra of complexes) determined by a field of sets $\mathbf{X} = ( X, \left(R_i\right)_I, \mathcal{F} )$ on a relational structure, is the Boolean algebra with operators
$$\mathcal{C}(\mathbf{X}) = ( \mathcal{F}, \cap, \cup, \prime, \empty, X, (f_i)_I )$$
where for all $i \in I,$ if $R_i$ is a relation of arity $n + 1,$ then $f_i$ is an operator of arity $n$ and for all $S_1, \ldots, S_n \in \mathcal{F}$
$$f_i(S_1, \ldots, S_n) = \left\{ x \in X : \text{ there exist } x_1 \in S_1, \ldots, x_n \in S_n \text{ such that } R_i(x_1, \ldots, x_n, x) \right\}$$

This construction can be generalized to fields of sets on arbitrary algebraic structures having both operators and relations as operators can be viewed as a special case of relations. If $\mathcal{F}$ is the whole power set of $X$ then $\mathcal{C}(\mathbf{X})$ is called a full complex algebra or power algebra.

Every (normal) Boolean algebra with operators can be represented as a field of sets on a relational structure in the sense that it is isomorphic to the complex algebra corresponding to the field.

(Historically the term complex was first used in the case where the algebraic structure was a group and has its origins in 19th century group theory where a subset of a group was called a complex.)

== See also ==
- Alexandrov topology – Type of topology in mathematics
- Algebra of sets – Identities and relationships involving sets
- Boolean ring – Algebraic structure in mathematics
- δ-ring – Ring closed under countable intersections
- General frame
- Interior algebra – Algebraic structure
- 𝜆-system (Dynkin system) – Family closed under complements and countable disjoint unions
- List of Boolean algebra topics
- Measure theory – Generalization of mass, length, area and volume
- Monotone class – Measure theory and probability theorem
- π-system – Family of sets closed under intersection
- Preordered field – Algebraic object with an ordered structure
- Probability theory – Branch of mathematics concerning probability
- Ring of sets – Family closed under unions and relative complements
- Set function – Function from sets to numbers
- σ-algebra – Algebraic structure of set algebra
- Sigma-ideal – Family closed under subsets and countable unions
- 𝜎-ring – Family of sets closed under countable unions
- Stone duality – Relationship between certain categories
- Stone's representation theorem for Boolean algebras – Every Boolean algebra is isomorphic to a certain field of sets

== Notes ==
Families $\mathcal{F}$ of sets over $\Omega$
Is necessarily true of $\mathcal{F}\colon$ or, is $\mathcal{F}$ closed under:	Directed by $\,\supseteq$	$A \cap B$	$A \cup B$	$B \setminus A$	$\Omega \setminus A$	$A_1 \cap A_2 \cap \cdots$	$A_1 \cup A_2 \cup \cdots$	$\Omega \in \mathcal{F}$	$\varnothing \in \mathcal{F}$	F.I.P.
π-system	Yes	Yes	No	No	No	No	No	No	No	No
Semiring	Yes	Yes	No	No	No	No	No	No	Yes	Never
Semialgebra (semifield)	Yes	Yes	No	No	No	No	No	No	Yes	Never
Monotone class	No	No	No	No	No	only if $A_i \searrow$	only if $A_i \nearrow$	No	No	No
𝜆-system (Dynkin system)	Yes	No	No	only if $A \subseteq B$	Yes	No	only if $A_i \nearrow$ or they are disjoint	Yes	Yes	Never
Ring (order theory)	Yes	Yes	Yes	No	No	No	No	No	No	No
Ring (measure theory)	Yes	Yes	Yes	Yes	No	No	No	No	Yes	Never
δ-ring	Yes	Yes	Yes	Yes	No	Yes	No	No	Yes	Never
𝜎-ring	Yes	Yes	Yes	Yes	No	Yes	Yes	No	Yes	Never
Algebra (field)	Yes	Yes	Yes	Yes	Yes	No	No	Yes	Yes	Never
𝜎-algebra (𝜎-field)	Yes	Yes	Yes	Yes	Yes	Yes	Yes	Yes	Yes	Never
Filter	Yes	Yes	Yes	No	No	No	Yes	Yes	No	No
Proper filter	Yes	Yes	Yes	Never	Never	No	Yes	Yes	Never	Yes
Prefilter (filter base)	Yes	No	No	No	No	No	No	No	No	Yes
Filter subbase	No	No	No	No	No	No	No	No	No	Yes
Open topology	Yes	Yes	Yes	No	No	No	(even arbitrary $\cup$)	Yes	Yes	Never
Closed topology	Yes	Yes	Yes	No	No	(even arbitrary $\cap$)	No	Yes	Yes	Never
Is necessarily true of $\mathcal{F}\colon$ or, is $\mathcal{F}$ closed under:	directed downward	finite intersections	finite unions	relative complements	complements in $\Omega$	countable intersections	countable unions	contains $\Omega$	contains $\varnothing$	Finite intersection property
Additionally, a semiring is a π-system where every complement $B \setminus A$ is equal to a finite disjoint union of sets in $\mathcal{F}.$ A semialgebra is a semiring where every complement $\Omega \setminus A$ is equal to a finite disjoint union of sets in $\mathcal{F}.$ $A, B, A_1, A_2, \ldots$ are arbitrary elements of $\mathcal{F}$ and it is assumed that $\mathcal{F} \neq \varnothing.$
