= Ideal on a set =

Non-empty family of sets that is closed under finite unions and subsets

In mathematics, an ideal on a set is a family of subsets that is closed under subsets and finite unions. Informally, sets that belong to the ideal are considered "small" or "negligible".

The concept is generalized both by ideals on a partially ordered set (an ideal on a set $X$ is an ideal on the powerset $\mathcal{P}(X)$ partially ordered by inclusion), and by ideals on rings (an ideal on $X$ is an ideal on the Boolean ring $\mathcal{P}(X)$). The notion dual to ideals is filters.

== Definition ==
Given a set $X$, an ideal $\mathcal{I}$ on $X$ is a set of subsets of $X$ such that:

- $\mathcal{I}$ is downwards-closed: If $A, B \subseteq X$ are such that $A \in \mathcal{I}$ and $B \subseteq A$ then $B \in \mathcal{I}$,
- $\mathcal{I}$ is closed under finite unions: $\varnothing \in I$, (Note: The union of zero subsets of $X$ is the empty set.) and if $A \in \mathcal{I}$ and $B \in \mathcal{I}$ then $A \cup B \in \mathcal{I}$.

A proper ideal is an ideal that is proper as a subset of the powerset $\mathcal{P}(X)$. By contrast, $\mathcal{P}(X)$ itself, consisting of all possible subsets, is called the improper ideal. By downwards-closure, an ideal is proper if and only if it does not contain $X$. Some authors adopt the convention that an ideal must be proper by definition.

== Terminology ==
An element of an ideal $I$ is said to be $I$-null or $I$-negligible, or simply null or negligible if the ideal $I$ is understood from context. If $I$ is an ideal on $X,$ then a subset of $X$ is said to be $I$-positive (or just positive) if it is not an element of $I.$ The collection of all $I$-positive subsets of $X$ is denoted $I^+.$

If $I$ is a proper ideal on $X$ and for every $A \subseteq X$ either $A \in I$ or $X \setminus A \in I,$ then $I$ is a prime ideal.

== Examples of ideals ==
=== General examples ===
- For any set $X$ and any arbitrarily chosen subset $B \subseteq X,$ the subsets of $B$ form an ideal on $X.$ For finite $X,$ all ideals are of this form.
- The finite subsets of any set $X$ form an ideal on $X.$
- For any measure space, subsets of sets of measure zero.
- For any measure space, sets of finite measure. This encompasses finite subsets (using counting measure) and small sets below.
- A bornology on a set $X$ is an ideal that covers $X.$
- A non-empty family $\mathcal{B}$ of subsets of $X$ is a proper ideal on $X$ if and only if its dual in $X,$ which is denoted and defined by $X \setminus \mathcal{B} := \{X \setminus B : B \in \mathcal{B}\},$ is a proper filter on $X$ (a filter is proper if it is not equal to $\wp(X)$). The dual of the power set $\wp(X)$ is itself; that is, $X \setminus \wp(X) = \wp(X).$ Thus a non-empty family $\mathcal{B} \subseteq \wp(X)$ is an ideal on $X$ if and only if its dual $X \setminus \mathcal{B}$ is a dual ideal on $X$ (which by definition is either the power set $\wp(X)$ or else a proper filter on $X$).

=== Ideals on the natural numbers ===
- The ideal of all finite sets of natural numbers is denoted Fin.
- The summable ideal on the natural numbers, denoted $\mathcal{I}_{1/n},$ is the collection of all sets $A$ of natural numbers such that the sum $\sum_{n\in A}\frac{1}{n+1}$ is finite. See small set.
- The ideal of asymptotically zero-density sets on the natural numbers, denoted $\mathcal{Z}_0,$ is the collection of all sets $A$ of natural numbers such that the fraction of natural numbers less than $n$ that belong to $A,$ tends to zero as $n$ tends to infinity. (That is, the asymptotic density of $A$ is zero.)

=== Ideals on the real numbers ===
- The measure ideal is the collection of all sets $A$ of real numbers such that the Lebesgue measure of $A$ is zero.
- The meager ideal is the collection of all meager sets of real numbers.

=== Ideals on other sets ===
- If $\lambda$ is an ordinal number of uncountable cofinality, the nonstationary ideal on $\lambda$ is the collection of all subsets of $\lambda$ that are not stationary sets. This ideal has been studied extensively by W. Hugh Woodin.

== Operations on ideals ==
Given ideals I and J on underlying sets X and Y respectively, one forms the skew or Fubini product $I \times J$, an ideal on the Cartesian product $X \times Y,$ as follows: For any subset $A \subseteq X \times Y,$
$$A \in I \times J \quad \text{ if and only if } \quad \{ x \in X \; : \; \{y : \langle x, y \rangle \in A\} \not\in J \} \in I$$
That is, a set lies in the product ideal if only a negligible collection of x-coordinates correspond to a non-negligible slice of A in the y-direction. (Perhaps clearer: A set is positive in the product ideal if positively many x-coordinates correspond to positive slices.)

An ideal I on a set X induces an equivalence relation on $\wp(X),$ the powerset of X, considering A and B to be equivalent (for $A, B$ subsets of X) if and only if the symmetric difference of A and B is an element of I. The quotient of $\wp(X)$ by this equivalence relation is a Boolean algebra, denoted $\wp(X) / I$ (read "P of X mod I").

To every ideal there is a corresponding filter, called its dual filter. If I is an ideal on X, then the dual filter of I is the collection of all sets $X \setminus A,$ where A is an element of I. Here $X \setminus A$ denotes the relative complement of A in X; that is, the collection of all elements of X that are not in A.

== Relationships among ideals ==
If $I$ and $J$ are ideals on $X$ and $Y$ respectively, $I$ and $J$ are Rudin–Keisler isomorphic if they are the same ideal except for renaming of the elements of their underlying sets (ignoring negligible sets). More formally, the requirement is that there be sets $A$ and $B,$ elements of $I$ and $J$ respectively, and a bijection $\varphi : X \setminus A \to Y \setminus B,$ such that for any subset $C \subseteq X,$ $C \in I$ if and only if the image of $C$ under $\varphi \in J.$

If $I$ and $J$ are Rudin–Keisler isomorphic, then $\wp(X) / I$ and $\wp(Y) / J$ are isomorphic as Boolean algebras. Isomorphisms of quotient Boolean algebras induced by Rudin–Keisler isomorphisms of ideals are called trivial isomorphisms.

== See also ==
- Bornology – Mathematical generalization of boundedness
- Filter (mathematics) – Special subset of a partially ordered set
- Filter on a set – Family of subsets representing "large" sets
- Ideal (order theory) – Nonempty, upper-bounded, downward-closed subset
- Ideal (ring theory) – Submodule of a mathematical ring
- π-system – Family of sets closed under intersection
- σ-ideal – Family closed under subsets and countable unions
