= Monotone class theorem =

Measure theory and probability theorem

In measure theory and probability, the monotone class theorem connects monotone classes and 𝜎-algebras. The theorem says that the smallest monotone class containing an algebra of sets $G$ is precisely the smallest 𝜎-algebra containing $G.$ It is used as a type of transfinite induction to prove many other theorems, such as Fubini's theorem.

== Definition of a monotone class ==
A monotone class is a family (i.e. class) $M$ of sets that is closed under countable monotone unions and also under countable monotone intersections. Explicitly, this means $M$ has the following properties:

1. if $A_1, A_2, \ldots \in M$ and $A_1 \subseteq A_2 \subseteq \cdots$ then ${\textstyle\bigcup\limits_{i = 1}^\infty} A_i \in M,$ and
2. if $B_1, B_2, \ldots \in M$ and $B_1 \supseteq B_2 \supseteq \cdots$ then ${\textstyle\bigcap\limits_{i = 1}^\infty} B_i \in M.$

== Monotone class theorem for sets ==
Monotone class theorem for sets—Let $G$ be an algebra of sets and define $M(G)$ to be the smallest monotone class containing $G.$ Then $M(G)$ is precisely the 𝜎-algebra generated by $G$; that is $\sigma(G) = M(G).$

== Monotone class theorem for functions ==
Monotone class theorem for functions—Let $\mathcal{A}$ be a π-system that contains $\Omega\,$ and let $\mathcal{H}$ be a collection of functions from $\Omega$ to $\R$ with the following properties:

1. If $A \in \mathcal{A}$ then $\mathbf{1}_A \in \mathcal{H}$ where $\mathbf{1}_A$ denotes the indicator function of $A.$
2. If $f, g \in \mathcal{H}$ and $c \in \Reals$ then $f + g$ and $c f \in \mathcal{H}.$
3. If $f_n \in \mathcal{H}$ is a sequence of non-negative functions that increase to a bounded function $f$ then $f \in \mathcal{H}.$

Then $\mathcal{H}$ contains all bounded functions that are measurable with respect to $\sigma(\mathcal{A}),$ which is the 𝜎-algebra generated by $\mathcal{A}.$

=== Proof ===
The following argument originates in Rick Durrett's Probability: Theory and Examples.

Proof

The assumption $\Omega\, \in \mathcal{A},$ (2), and (3) imply that $\mathcal{G} = \left\{A : \mathbf{1}_{A} \in \mathcal{H}\right\}$ is a 𝜆-system. By (1) and the π−𝜆 theorem, $\sigma(\mathcal{A}) \subseteq \mathcal{G}.$ Statement (2) implies that $\mathcal{H}$ contains all simple functions, and then (3) implies that $\mathcal{H}$ contains all bounded functions measurable with respect to $\sigma(\mathcal{A}).$

== Results and applications ==
As a corollary, if $G$ is a ring of sets, then the smallest monotone class containing it coincides with the 𝜎-ring of $G.$

By invoking this theorem, one can use monotone classes to help verify that a certain collection of subsets is a 𝜎-algebra.

The monotone class theorem for functions can be a powerful tool that allows statements about particularly simple classes of functions to be generalized to arbitrary bounded and measurable functions.

== See also ==
- Dynkin system – Family closed under complements and countable disjoint unions
- π-𝜆 theorem – Family closed under complements and countable disjoint unions
- π-system – Family of sets closed under intersection
- σ-algebra – Algebraic structure of set algebra
