= Coherent topology =

Topology determined by family of subspaces

In topology, a coherent topology is a topology that is uniquely determined by a family of subspaces. Loosely speaking, a topological space is coherent with a family of subspaces if it is a topological union of those subspaces. It is also sometimes called the weak topology generated by the family of subspaces, a notion that is quite different from the notion of a weak topology generated by a set of maps.

== Definition ==
Let $X$ be a topological space and let $C = \left\{ C_{\alpha} : \alpha \in A \right\}$ be a family of subsets of $X,$ each with its induced subspace topology. (Typically $C$ will be a cover of $X$.) Then $X$ is said to be coherent with $C$ (or determined by $C$) if the topology of $X$ is recovered as the one coming from the final topology coinduced by the inclusion maps $i_\alpha : C_\alpha \to X \qquad \alpha \in A.$ By definition, this is the finest topology on (the underlying set of) $X$ for which the inclusion maps are continuous. $X$ is coherent with $C$ if either of the following two equivalent conditions holds:

- A subset $U$ is open in $X$ if and only if $U \cap C_{\alpha}$ is open in $C_{\alpha}$ for each $\alpha \in A.$
- A subset $U$ is closed in $X$ if and only if $U \cap C_{\alpha}$ is closed in $C_{\alpha}$ for each $\alpha \in A.$

== Examples ==
- A topological space $X$ is coherent with every open cover of $X.$ More generally, $X$ is coherent with any family of subsets whose interiors cover $X.$ As examples of this, a weakly locally compact space is coherent with the family of its compact subspaces. And a locally connected space is coherent with the family of its connected subsets.
- A topological space $X$ is coherent with every locally finite closed cover of $X.$
- A discrete space is coherent with every family of subspaces (including the empty family).
- A topological space $X$ is coherent with a partition of $X$ if and only $X$ is homeomorphic to the disjoint union of the elements of the partition.
- Finitely generated spaces are those determined by the family of all their finite subspaces.
- Countably generated spaces are those determined by the family of all their countable subspaces.
- Compactly generated spaces (in the sense of Definition 1 in that article) are those determined by the family of all their compact subspaces.
- A CW complex $X$ is coherent with its family of $n$-skeletons $X_n.$

== Topological union ==
Let $\left\{ X_\alpha : \alpha \in A \right\}$ be a family of (not necessarily disjoint) topological spaces such that the induced topologies agree on each intersection $X_{\alpha} \cap X_{\beta}.$ Assume further that $X_{\alpha} \cap X_{\beta}$ is closed in $X_{\alpha}$ for each $\alpha, \beta \in A.$ Then the topological union $X$ is the set-theoretic union $X^{set} = \bigcup_{\alpha\in A} X_\alpha$ endowed with the final topology coinduced by the inclusion maps $i_\alpha : X_\alpha \to X^{set}$. The inclusion maps will then be topological embeddings and $X$ will be coherent with the subspaces $\left\{ X_{\alpha} \right\}.$

Conversely, if $X$ is a topological space and is coherent with a family of subspaces $\left\{ C_{\alpha} \right\}$ that cover $X,$ then $X$ is homeomorphic to the topological union of the family $\left\{ C_{\alpha} \right\}.$

One can form the topological union of an arbitrary family of topological spaces as above, but if the topologies do not agree on the intersections then the inclusions will not necessarily be embeddings.

One can also describe the topological union by means of the disjoint union. Specifically, if $X$ is a topological union of the family $\left\{ X_{\alpha} \right\},$ then $X$ is homeomorphic to the quotient of the disjoint union of the family $\left\{ X_{\alpha} \right\}$ by the equivalence relation $(x,\alpha) \sim (y,\beta) \Leftrightarrow x = y$ for all $\alpha, \beta \in A.$; that is, $X \cong \coprod_{\alpha\in A}X_\alpha / \sim .$

If the spaces $\left\{ X_{\alpha} \right\}$ are all disjoint then the topological union is just the disjoint union.

Assume now that the set A is directed, in a way compatible with inclusion: $\alpha \leq \beta$ whenever $X_\alpha\subset X_{\beta}$. Then there is a unique map from $\varinjlim X_\alpha$ to $X,$ which is in fact a homeomorphism. Here $\varinjlim X_\alpha$ is the direct (inductive) limit (colimit) of $\left\{ X_{\alpha} \right\}$ in the category Top.

== Properties ==
Let $X$ be coherent with a family of subspaces $\left\{ C_{\alpha} \right\}.$ A function $f : X \to Y$ from $X$ to a topological space $Y$ is continuous if and only if the restrictions $f\big\vert_{C_{\alpha}} : C_{\alpha} \to Y\,$ are continuous for each $\alpha \in A.$ This universal property characterizes coherent topologies in the sense that a space $X$ is coherent with $C$ if and only if this property holds for all spaces $Y$ and all functions $f : X \to Y.$

Let $X$ be determined by a cover $C = \{ C_{\alpha} \}.$ Then

- If $C$ is a refinement of a cover $D,$ then $X$ is determined by $D.$ In particular, if $C$ is a subcover of $D,$ $X$ is determined by $D.$
- If $D=\{D_\beta\}$ is a refinement of $C$ and each $C_{\alpha}$ is determined by the family of all $D_{\beta}$ contained in $C_{\alpha}$ then $X$ is determined by $D.$
- Let $Y$ be an open or closed subspace of $X,$ or more generally a locally closed subset of $X.$ Then $Y$ is determined by $\left\{ Y \cap C_{\alpha} \right\}.$
- Let $f : X \to Y$ be a quotient map. Then $Y$ is determined by $\left\{ f(C_{\alpha}) \right\}.$

Let $f : X \to Y$ be a surjective map and suppose $Y$ is determined by $\left\{ D_{\alpha} : \alpha \in A \right\}.$ For each $\alpha \in A$ let $f_\alpha : f^{-1}(D_\alpha) \to D_\alpha\,$be the restriction of $f$ to $f^{-1}(D_{\alpha}).$ Then

- If $f$ is continuous and each $f_{\alpha}$ is a quotient map, then $f$ is a quotient map.
- $f$ is a closed map (resp. open map) if and only if each $f_{\alpha}$ is closed (resp. open).

Given a topological space $(X,\tau)$ and a family of subspaces $C=\{C_\alpha\}$ there is a unique topology $\tau_C$ on $X$ that is coherent with $C.$ The topology $\tau_C$ is finer than the original topology $\tau,$ and strictly finer if $\tau$ was not coherent with $C.$ But the topologies $\tau$ and $\tau_C$ induce the same subspace topology on each of the $C_\alpha$ in the family $C.$ And the topology $\tau_C$ is always coherent with $C.$

As an example of this last construction, if $C$ is the collection of all compact subspaces of a topological space $(X,\tau),$ the resulting topology $\tau_C$ defines the k-ification $kX$ of $X.$ The spaces $X$ and $kX$ have the same compact sets, with the same induced subspace topologies on them. And the k-ification $kX$ is compactly generated.

== See also ==
- Final topology – Finest topology making some functions continuous
