= Countably generated space =

In mathematics, a topological space $X$ is called countably generated if the topology of $X$ is determined by the countable sets in a similar way as the topology of a sequential space (or a Fréchet space) is determined by the convergent sequences.

The countably generated spaces are precisely the spaces having countable tightness—therefore the name countably tight is used as well.

== Definition ==
A topological space $X$ is called countably generated if the topology on $X$ is coherent with the family of its countable subspaces. In other words, any subset $V \subseteq X$ is closed in $X$ whenever for each countable subspace $U$ of $X$ the set $V \cap U$ is closed in $U;$ or equivalently, any subset $V \subseteq X$ is open in $X$ whenever for each countable subspace $U$ of $X$ the set $V \cap U$ is open in $U.$

Equivalently, $X$ is countably tight; that is, for every set $A\subseteq X$ and every point $x\in\overline A$, there is a countable set $D\subseteq A$ with $x\in\overline D.$ In other words, the closure of $A$ is the union of the closures of all countable subsets of $A.$

== Countable fan tightness ==
A topological space $X$ has countable fan tightness if for every point $x \in X$ and every sequence $A_1, A_2, \ldots$ of subsets of the space $X$ such that $x \in {\textstyle\bigcap\limits_n} \, \overline{A_n} = \overline{A_1} \cap \overline{A_2} \cap \cdots,$ there are finite set $B_1\subseteq A_1, B_2 \subseteq A_2, \ldots$ such that $x \in \overline{{\textstyle\bigcup\limits_n} \, B_n} = \overline{B_1 \cup B_2 \cup \cdots}.$

A topological space $X$ has countable strong fan tightness if for every point $x \in X$ and every sequence $A_1, A_2, \ldots$ of subsets of the space $X$ such that $x \in {\textstyle\bigcap\limits_n} \, \overline{A_n} = \overline{A_1} \cap \overline{A_2} \cap \cdots,$ there are points $x_1 \in A_1, x_2 \in A_2, \ldots$ such that $x \in \overline{\left\{x_1, x_2, \ldots\right\}}.$ Every strong Fréchet–Urysohn space has strong countable fan tightness.

== Properties ==
A quotient of a countably generated space is again countably generated. Similarly, a topological sum of countably generated spaces is countably generated. Therefore, the countably generated spaces form a coreflective subcategory of the category of topological spaces. They are the coreflective hull of all countable spaces.

Any subspace of a countably generated space is again countably generated.

== Examples ==
Every sequential space (in particular, every metrizable space) is countably generated.

An example of a space which is countably generated but not sequential can be obtained, for instance, as a subspace of Arens–Fort space.

== See also ==
- Finitely generated space – Type of topology in mathematics
- Locally closed subset – Intersection of an open set and a closed set
