= Category of compactly generated weak Hausdorff spaces =

Category used in algebraic topology

In mathematics, the category of compactly generated weak Hausdorff spaces, CGWH, is a category used in algebraic topology as an alternative to the category of topological spaces, Top, as the latter lacks some properties that are common in practice and often convenient to use in proofs. There is also such a category for the CGWH analog of pointed topological spaces, defined by requiring maps to preserve base points.

The articles compactly generated space and weak Hausdorff space define the respective topological properties. For the historical motivation behind these conditions on spaces, see Compactly generated space#Motivation. This article focuses on the properties of the category.

== Properties ==
CGWH has the following properties:

- It is complete and cocomplete.
- The forgetful functor to the sets preserves small limits.
- It contains all the locally compact Hausdorff spaces and all the CW complexes.
- An internal Hom exists for any pairs of spaces X and Y; it is denoted by $\operatorname{Map}(X, Y)$ or $Y^X$ and is called the (free) mapping space from X to Y. Moreover, there is a homeomorphism
  $$\operatorname{Map}(X \times Y, Z) \simeq \operatorname{Map}(X, \operatorname{Map}(Y, Z))$$

that is natural in X, Y, and Z. In short, the category is Cartesian closed in an enriched sense.

- A finite product of CW complexes is a CW complex.
- If $(X, *)$ and $(Y, \circ)$ are pointed spaces, then the smash product of them exists. The (based) mapping space $\operatorname{Map}( (X, *), (Y, \circ))$ from $(X, *)$ to $(Y, \circ)$ consists of all base-point-preserving maps from $(X, *)$ to $(Y, \circ)$ and is a closed subspace of the mapping space between the underlying spaces without base points. It is a based space with the base point the unique constant map. Moreover, for based spaces $(X, *)$, $(Y, \circ)$, and $(Z, \star)$, there is a homeomorphism
  $$\operatorname{Map}((X, *) \wedge (Y, \circ), (Z, \star)) \simeq \operatorname{Map}((X, *), \operatorname{Map}((Y, \circ), (Z, \star)))$$

that is natural in $(X, *)$, $(Y, \circ)$, and $(Z, \star)$.
