= Adjunction space =

In mathematics, an adjunction space (or attaching space) is a common construction in topology where one topological space is attached or "glued" onto another. Specifically, let $X$ and $Y$ be topological spaces, and let $A$ be a subspace of $Y$. Let $f : A \rightarrow X$ be a continuous map (called the attaching map). One forms the adjunction space $X \cup_f Y$ (sometimes also written as $X +_f Y$) by taking the disjoint union of $X$ and $Y$ and identifying $a$ with $f(a)$ for all $a$ in $A$. Formally,

$$X\cup_f Y = (X\sqcup Y) / \sim$$

where the equivalence relation $\sim$ is generated by $a\sim f(a)$ for all $a$ in $A$, and the quotient is given the quotient topology. As a set, $X \cup_f Y$ consists of the disjoint union of $X$ and ($Y-A$). The topology, however, is specified by the quotient construction.

Intuitively, one may think of $Y$ as being glued onto $X$ via the map $f$.

== Examples ==
- A common example of an adjunction space is given when Y is a closed n-ball (or cell) and A is the boundary of the ball, the (n−1)-sphere. Inductively attaching cells along their spherical boundaries to this space results in an example of a CW complex.
- Adjunction spaces are also used to define connected sums of manifolds. Here, one first removes open balls from X and Y before attaching the boundaries of the removed balls along an attaching map.
- If A is a space with one point then the adjunction is the wedge sum of X and Y.
- If X is a space with one point then the adjunction is the quotient Y/A.

== Properties ==
The continuous maps h : X ∪_{f} Y → Z are in 1-1 correspondence with the pairs of continuous maps h_{X} : X → Z and h_{Y} : Y → Z that satisfy h_{X}(f(a))=h_{Y}(a) for all a in A.

In the case where A is a closed subspace of Y one can show that the map X → X ∪_{f} Y is a closed embedding and (Y − A) → X ∪_{f} Y is an open embedding.

== Categorical description ==
The attaching construction is an example of a pushout in the category of topological spaces. That is to say, the adjunction space is universal with respect to the following commutative diagram:

Here i is the inclusion map and Φ_{X}, Φ_{Y} are the maps obtained by composing the quotient map with the canonical injections into the disjoint union of X and Y. One can form a more general pushout by replacing i with an arbitrary continuous map g—the construction is similar. Conversely, if f is also an inclusion the attaching construction is to simply glue X and Y together along their common subspace.

== See also ==
- Quotient space
- Mapping cylinder
