= Infinite-dimensional sphere =

Limit of spheres in algebraic topology

In algebraic topology, the infinite-dimensional sphere is the inductive limit of all spheres. Although no sphere is contractible, the infinite-dimensional sphere is contractible and hence appears as the total space of multiple universal principal bundles.

== Definition ==
With the usual definition $S^n=\{x\in\mathbb{R}^{n+1}|\|x\|_2=1\}$ of the sphere with the 2-norm, the canonical inclusion $\mathbb{R}^{n+1}\hookrightarrow\mathbb{R}^{n+2},x\mapsto(x,0)$ restricts to a canonical inclusion $S^n\hookrightarrow S^{n+1}$. Hence the spheres form an inductive system, whose inductive limit:

$$S^\infty
:=\lim_{n\rightarrow\infty}S^n$$

is the infinite-dimensional sphere.

== Properties ==
The most important property of the infinite-dimensional sphere is that it is contractible. Since the infinite-dimensional sphere inherits a CW structure from the spheres, Whitehead's theorem claims that it is sufficient to show that it is weakly contractible. Intuitively, the homotopy groups of the spheres disappear one by one, hence all do for the infinite-dimensional sphere. Concretely, any map $S^k\rightarrow S^\infty$, due to the compactness of the former sphere, factors over a canonical inclusion $S^n\hookrightarrow S^\infty$ with $k<n$ without loss of generality. Since $\pi_k(S^n)$ is trivial, $\pi_k(S^\infty)$ is also trivial.

== Application ==
- $S^\infty\twoheadrightarrow\mathbb{R}P^\infty$ is the universal principal $\operatorname{O}(1)$-bundle, hence $\operatorname{EO}(1)\cong S^\infty$. The principal $\operatorname{O}(1)$-bundle $S^n\twoheadrightarrow\mathbb{R}P^n$ is then the canonical inclusion $i\colon\mathbb{R}P^n \hookrightarrow\mathbb{R}P^\infty$, hence $S^n\cong i^*S^\infty$.
- $S^\infty\twoheadrightarrow\mathbb{C}P^\infty$ is the universal principal U(1)-bundle, hence $\operatorname{EU}(1)\cong\operatorname{ESO}(2)\cong S^\infty$. The principal $\operatorname{U}(1)$-bundle $S^{2n+1}\twoheadrightarrow\mathbb{C}P^n$ is then the canonical inclusion $j\colon\mathbb{C}P^n \hookrightarrow\mathbb{C}P^\infty$, hence $S^{2n+1}\cong j^*S^\infty$.
- $S^\infty\twoheadrightarrow\mathbb{H}P^\infty$ is the universal principal SU(2)-bundle, hence $\operatorname{ESU}(2)\cong\operatorname{ESp}(1)\cong S^\infty$. The principal $\operatorname{SU}(2)$-bundle $S^{4n+3}\twoheadrightarrow\mathbb{H}P^n$ is then the canonical inclusion $k\colon\mathbb{H}P^n \hookrightarrow\mathbb{H}P^\infty$, hence $S^{4n+3}\cong k^*S^\infty$.

== Literature ==
- Hatcher, Allen (2001). Algebraic Topology. Cambridge University Press. ISBN 978-0-521-79160-1.
- tom Dieck, Tammo (2008-09-01). Algebraic Topology (PDF). ISBN 978-3037190487.
