= Cell structure =

Cell structure may refer to:

- Cell (biology)#Anatomy
- An organelle, or the layout of organelles of the biological cell itself
- The structure of a covert cell, often involved in underground resistance, organised crime, terrorism or any group requiring stealth in its operations
- In mathematics, the structure of a cell complex
