= Weak Hausdorff space =

Separation axioms in topological spaces

Kolmogorov classification
- T_{0}: (Kolmogorov)
- T_{1}: (Fréchet)
- T_{2}: (Hausdorff)
- T_{2½}: (Urysohn)
- completely T_{2}: (completely Hausdorff)
- T_{3}: (regular Hausdorff)
- T_{3½}: (Tychonoff)
- T_{4}: (normal Hausdorff)
- T_{5}: (completely normal Hausdorff)
- T_{6}: (perfectly normal Hausdorff)

In mathematics, a weak Hausdorff space or weakly Hausdorff space is a topological space where the image of every continuous map from a compact Hausdorff space into the space is closed. The notion was introduced by M. C. McCord to remedy an inconvenience of working with the category of Hausdorff spaces. It is often used in tandem with compactly generated spaces in algebraic topology. For that, see the category of compactly generated weak Hausdorff spaces.

Their strictness as separation properties in increasing order is

- T_{1}: every single-point set is closed.
- Δ-Hausdorff: the image of every path is closed.
- weak Hausdorff: the image under a continuous map of a compact Hausdorff space is closed.
- KC space: every compact subset is closed.
- k-Hausdorff: every compact subspace is Hausdorff.
- Hausdorff (T_{2}): distinct points have disjoint neighborhoods.

These are further described in the below.

== k-Hausdorff spaces ==
A k-Hausdorff space is a topological space which satisfies any of the following equivalent conditions:

1. Each compact subspace is Hausdorff.
2. The diagonal $\{(x, x) : x \in X\}$ is k-closed in $X \times X.$
  - A subset $A \subseteq Y$ is k-closed, if $A \cap K$ is closed in $K$ for each compact $K \subseteq Y.$
3. Each compact subspace is closed and strongly locally compact.
  - A space is strongly locally compact if for each $x \in X$ and each (not necessarily open) neighborhood $U \subseteq X$ of $x,$ there exists a compact neighborhood $V \subseteq X$ of $x$ such that $V \subseteq U.$

=== Properties ===
- A Hausdorff space is k-Hausdorff. For a space is Hausdorff if and only if the diagonal $\{(x, x) : x \in X\}$ is closed in $X \times X,$ and each closed subset is a k-closed set.
- A k-Hausdorff space is KC. A KC space is a topological space in which every compact subspace is closed.
- A KC space is weak Hausdorff. For if $X$ is KC and $f : K \to X$ is a continuous map from a compact space $K,$ then $f(K)$ is compact, hence closed.
- To show that the coherent topology induced by compact Hausdorff subspaces preserves the compact Hausdorff subspaces and their subspace topology requires that the space be k-Hausdorff; weak Hausdorff is not enough. Hence k-Hausdorff can be seen as the more fundamental definition.

== Δ-Hausdorff spaces ==
A Δ-Hausdorff space is a topological space where the image of every path is closed; that is, if whenever $f : [0, 1] \to X$ is continuous then $f([0, 1])$ is closed in $X.$ Every weak Hausdorff space is $\Delta$-Hausdorff, and every $\Delta$-Hausdorff space is a T_{1} space. A space is Δ-generated if its topology is the finest topology such that each map $f : \Delta^n \to X$ from a topological $n$-simplex $\Delta^n$ to $X$ is continuous. $\Delta$-Hausdorff spaces are to $\Delta$-generated spaces as weak Hausdorff spaces are to compactly generated spaces.

== See also ==
- Fixed-point space – Space where all functions have fixed points, a Hausdorff space where every continuous function from the space into itself has a fixed point.
- Hausdorff space – Type of topological space
- Locally Hausdorff space – Space such that every point has a Hausdorff neighborhood
- Particular point topology – Topology where a set is open if it contains a particular point
- Quasitopological space – Function in topology
- Separation axiom – Axioms in topology defining notions of "separation"
