= Finitely generated object =

Concept in category theory

In category theory, a finitely generated object is the quotient of a free object over a finite set, in the sense that it is the target of a regular epimorphism from a free object that is free on a finite set.

For instance, one way of defining a finitely generated group is that it is the image of a group homomorphism from a finitely generated free group.

== See also ==
- Finitely generated group
- Finitely generated monoid
- Finitely generated abelian group
- Finitely generated module
- Finitely generated ideal
- Finitely generated algebra
- Finitely generated space
