= Alexandrov topology =

Type of topology in mathematics

In general topology, an Alexandrov topology is a topology in which the intersection of an arbitrary family of open sets is open (while the definition of a topology only requires this for a finite family). Equivalently, an Alexandrov topology is one whose open sets are the upper sets for some preorder on the space.

Spaces with an Alexandrov topology are also known as Alexandrov-discrete spaces or finitely generated spaces. The latter name stems from the fact that their topology is uniquely determined by the family of all finite subspaces. This makes them a generalization of finite topological spaces.

Alexandrov-discrete spaces are named after the Russian topologist Pavel Alexandrov. They should not be confused with Alexandrov spaces from Riemannian geometry introduced by the Russian mathematician Aleksandr Danilovich Aleksandrov.

== Characterizations of Alexandrov topologies ==
Alexandrov topologies have numerous characterizations. In a topological space $X$, the following conditions are equivalent:

- Open and closed set characterizations:
  - An arbitrary intersection of open sets is open.
  - An arbitrary union of closed sets is closed.
- Neighbourhood characterizations:
  - Every point has a smallest neighbourhood.
  - The neighbourhood filter of every point is closed under arbitrary intersections.
- Interior and closure algebraic characterizations:
  - The interior operator distributes over arbitrary intersections of subsets.
  - The closure operator distributes over arbitrary unions of subsets.
- Preorder characterizations:
  - The topology is the finest topology among topologies on $X$ with the same specialization preorder.
  - The open sets are precisely the upper sets for some preorder on $X$.
- Finite generation and category theoretic characterizations:
  - The closure of a subset is the union of the closures of its finite subsets (and thus also the union of the closures of its singleton subsets).
  - The topology is coherent with the finite subspaces of $X$.
  - The inclusion maps of the finite subspaces of $X$ form a final sink.
  - $X$ is finitely generated, i.e., it is in the final hull of its finite spaces. (This means that there is a final sink $f_i : X_i \to X$ where each $X_i$ is a finite topological space.)

== Correspondence with preordered sets ==
An Alexandrov topology is canonically associated to a preordered set by taking the open sets to be the upper sets. Conversely, the preordered set can be recovered from the Alexandrov topology as its specialization preorder. (We use the convention that the specialization preorder is defined by $x \leq y$ whenever $x\in\operatorname{cl}\{y\},$ that is, when every open set that contains $x$ also contains $y$, to match our convention that the open sets in the Alexandrov topology are the upper sets rather than the lower sets; the opposite convention also exists.)

The following dictionary holds between order-theoretic notions and topological notions:

- Open sets are upper sets,
- Closed sets are lower sets,
- The interior of a subset $S$ is the set of elements $x \in S$ such that $y \in S$ whenever $x \leq y$.
- The closure of a subset is its lower closure.
- A map $f : X \to Y$ between two spaces with Alexandrov topologies is continuous if and only if it is order preserving as a function between the underlying preordered sets.

From the point of view of category theory, let Top denote the category of topological spaces consisting of topological spaces with continuous maps as morphisms. Let Alex denote its full subcategory consisting of Alexandrov-discrete spaces. Let Preord denote the category of preordered sets consisting of preordered sets with order preserving functions as morphisms. The correspondence above is an isomorphism of categories between Alex and PreOrd.

Furthermore, the functor $A : \mathbf{PreOrd} \to \mathbf{Top}$ that sends a preordered set to its associated Alexandrov-discrete space is fully faithful and left adjoint to the specialization preorder functor $S : \mathbf{Top} \to \mathbf{PreOrd}$, making Alex a coreflective subcategory of Top. Moreover, the reflection morphisms $A(S(X)) \to X$, whose underlying maps are the identities (but with different topologies at the source and target), are bijective continuous maps, thus bimorphisms.

== Properties ==
A subspace of an Alexandrov-discrete space is Alexandrov-discrete. So is a quotient of an Alexandrov-discrete space (because inverse images are compatible with arbitrary unions and intersections).

The product of two Alexandrov-discrete spaces is Alexandrov-discrete. More generally, the box product of an arbitrary number of Alexandrov-discrete spaces is Alexandrov-discrete.

Every Alexandrov topology is first countable (since every point has a smallest neighborhood).

Every Alexandrov topology is locally compact in the sense that every point has a local base of compact neighbourhoods, since the smallest neighbourhood of a point is always compact. Indeed, if $U$ is the smallest (open) neighbourhood of a point $x$, in $U$ itself with the subspace topology any open cover of $U$ contains a neighbourhood of $x$ included in $U$. Such a neighbourhood is necessarily equal to $U$, so the open cover admits $\{U\}$ as a finite subcover.

Every Alexandrov topology is locally path connected.

Considering the interior operator and closure operator to be modal operators on the power set Boolean algebra of an Alexandroff-discrete space, their construction is a special case of the construction of a modal algebra from a modal frame i.e. from a set with a single binary relation. (The latter construction is itself a special case of a more general construction of a complex algebra from a relational structure i.e. a set with relations defined on it.) The class of modal algebras that we obtain in the case of a preordered set is the class of interior algebras—the algebraic abstractions of topological spaces.

== History ==
Alexandrov spaces were first introduced in 1937 by P. S. Alexandrov under the name discrete spaces, where he provided the characterizations in terms of sets and neighbourhoods. The name discrete spaces later came to be used for topological spaces in which every subset is open and the original concept lay forgotten in the topological literature. On the other hand, Alexandrov spaces played a relevant role in Øystein Ore's pioneering studies on closure systems and their relationships with lattice theory and topology.

With the advancement of categorical topology in the 1980s, Alexandrov spaces were rediscovered when the concept of finite generation was applied to general topology and the name finitely generated spaces was adopted for them. Alexandrov spaces were also rediscovered around the same time in the context of topologies resulting from denotational semantics and domain theory in computer science.

In 1966 Michael C. McCord and A. K. Steiner each independently observed an equivalence between partially ordered sets and spaces that were precisely the T_{0} versions of the spaces that Alexandrov had introduced. P. T. Johnstone referred to such topologies as Alexandrov topologies. F. G. Arenas independently proposed this name for the general version of these topologies. McCord also showed that these spaces are weak homotopy equivalent to the order complex of the corresponding partially ordered set. Steiner demonstrated that the equivalence is a contravariant lattice isomorphism preserving arbitrary meets and joins as well as complementation.

It was also a well-known result in the field of modal logic that an equivalence exists between finite topological spaces and preorders on finite sets (the finite model frames for the modal logic S4). A. Grzegorczyk observed that this extended to a equivalence between what he referred to as totally distributive spaces and preorders. C. Naturman observed that these spaces were the Alexandrov-discrete spaces and extended the result to a category-theoretic equivalence between the category of Alexandrov-discrete spaces and (open) continuous maps, and the category of preorders and (bounded) monotone maps, providing the preorder characterizations as well as the interior and closure algebraic characterizations.

A systematic investigation of these spaces from the point of view of general topology, which had been neglected since the original paper by Alexandrov was taken up by F. G. Arenas.

== See also ==
- P-space, a space satisfying the weaker condition that countable intersections of open sets are open
