= Final topology =

Finest topology making some functions continuous

In general topology and related areas of mathematics, the final topology (or coinduced, strong, colimit, or inductive topology) on a set $X,$ with respect to a family of functions from topological spaces into $X,$ is the finest topology on $X$ that makes all those functions continuous.

The quotient topology on a quotient space is a final topology, with respect to a single surjective function, namely the quotient map. The disjoint union topology is the final topology with respect to the inclusion maps. The final topology is also the topology that every direct limit in the category of topological spaces is endowed with, and it is in the context of direct limits that the final topology often appears. A topology is coherent with some collection of subspaces if and only if it is the final topology induced by the natural inclusions.

The dual notion is the initial topology, which for a given family of functions from a set $X$ into topological spaces is the coarsest topology on $X$ that makes those functions continuous.

== Definition ==
Given a set $X$ and an $I$-indexed family of topological spaces $\left(Y_i, \upsilon_i\right)$ with associated functions
$$f_i : Y_i \to X,$$
the final topology on $X$ induced by the family of functions $\mathcal{F} := \left\{ f_i : i \in I \right\}$ is the finest topology $\tau_{\mathcal{F}}$ on $X$ such that
$$f_i : \left(Y_i, \upsilon_i\right) \to \left(X, \tau_{\mathcal{F}}\right)$$

is continuous for each $i\in I$. The final topology always exists, and is unique.

Explicitly, the final topology may be described as follows:

a subset $U$ of $X$ is open in the final topology $\left(X, \tau_{\mathcal{F}}\right)$ (that is, $U \in \tau_{\mathcal{F}}$) if and only if $f_i^{-1}(U)$ is open in $\left(Y_i, \upsilon_i\right)$ for each $i\in I$.

The closed subsets have an analogous characterization:

a subset $C$ of $X$ is closed in the final topology $\left(X, \tau_{\mathcal{F}}\right)$ if and only if $f_i^{-1}(C)$ is closed in $\left(Y_i, \upsilon_i\right)$ for each $i\in I$.

The family $\mathcal{F}$ of functions that induces the final topology on $X$ is usually a set of functions. But the same construction can be performed if $\mathcal{F}$ is a proper class of functions, and the result is still well-defined in Zermelo–Fraenkel set theory. In that case there is always a subfamily $\mathcal{G}$ of $\mathcal{F}$ with $\mathcal{G}$ a set, such that the final topologies on $X$ induced by $\mathcal{F}$ and by $\mathcal{G}$ coincide. For more on this, see for example the discussion here. As an example, a commonly used variant of the notion of compactly generated space is defined as the final topology with respect to a proper class of functions.

== Examples ==
The important special case where the family of maps $\mathcal{F}$ consists of a single surjective map can be completely characterized using the notion of quotient map. A surjective function $f : (Y, \upsilon) \to \left(X, \tau\right)$ between topological spaces is a quotient map if and only if the topology $\tau$ on $X$ coincides with the final topology $\tau_{\mathcal{F}}$ induced by the family $\mathcal{F}=\{f\}$. In particular: the quotient topology is the final topology on the quotient space induced by the quotient map.

The final topology on a set $X$ induced by a family of $X$-valued maps can be viewed as a far reaching generalization of the quotient topology, where multiple maps may be used instead of just one and where these maps are not required to be surjections.

Given topological spaces $X_i$, the disjoint union topology on the disjoint union $\coprod_i X_i$ is the final topology on the disjoint union induced by the natural injections.

Given a family of topologies $\left(\tau_i\right)_{i \in I}$ on a fixed set $X,$ the final topology on $X$ with respect to the identity maps $\operatorname{id}_{\tau_i} : \left(X, \tau_i\right) \to X$ as $i$ ranges over $I,$ call it $\tau,$ is the infimum (or meet) of these topologies $\left(\tau_i\right)_{i \in I}$ in the lattice of topologies on $X.$ That is, the final topology $\tau$ is equal to the intersection $\tau = \bigcap_{i \in I} \tau_i.$

Given a topological space $(X,\tau)$ and a family $\mathcal C=\{ C_i : i\in I\}$ of subsets of $X$ each having the subspace topology, the final topology $\tau_{\mathcal C}$ induced by all the inclusion maps of the $C_i$ into $X$ is finer than (or equal to) the original topology $\tau$ on $X.$ The space $X$ is called coherent with the family $\mathcal C$ of subspaces if the final topology $\tau_{\mathcal C}$ coincides with the original topology $\tau.$ In that case, a subset $U\subseteq X$ will be open in $X$ exactly when the intersection $U\cap C_i$ is open in $C_i$ for each $i\in I.$ (See the coherent topology article for more details on this notion and more examples.) As a particular case, one of the notions of compactly generated space can be characterized as a certain coherent topology.

The direct limit of any direct system of spaces and continuous maps is the set-theoretic direct limit together with the final topology determined by the canonical morphisms. Explicitly, this means that if $\operatorname{Sys}_Y = \left(Y_i, f_{ji}, I\right)$ is a direct system in the category Top of topological spaces and if $\left(X, \left(f_i\right)_{i \in I}\right)$ is a direct limit of $\operatorname{Sys}_Y$ in the category Set of all sets, then by endowing $X$ with the final topology $\tau_{\mathcal{F}}$ induced by $\mathcal{F} := \left\{ f_i : i \in I \right\},$ $\left(\left(X, \tau_{\mathcal{F}}\right), \left(f_i\right)_{i \in I}\right)$ becomes the direct limit of $\operatorname{Sys}_Y$ in the category Top.

The étalé space of a sheaf is topologized by a final topology.

A first-countable Hausdorff space $(X, \tau)$ is locally path-connected if and only if $\tau$ is equal to the final topology on $X$ induced by the set $C\left([0, 1]; X\right)$ of all continuous maps $[0, 1] \to (X, \tau),$ where any such map is called a path in $(X, \tau).$

If a Hausdorff locally convex topological vector space $(X, \tau)$ is a Fréchet-Urysohn space then $\tau$ is equal to the final topology on $X$ induced by the set $\operatorname{Arc}\left([0, 1]; X\right)$ of all arcs in $(X, \tau),$ which by definition are continuous paths $[0, 1] \to (X, \tau)$ that are also topological embeddings.

== Properties ==
=== Characterization via continuous maps ===
Given functions $f_i : Y_i \to X,$ from topological spaces $Y_i$ to the set $X$, the final topology on $X$ with respect to these functions $f_i$ satisfies the following property:

a function $g$ from $X$ to some space $Z$ is continuous if and only if $g \circ f_i$ is continuous for each $i \in I.$

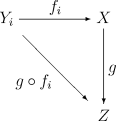
Characteristic property of the final topology

This property characterizes the final topology in the sense that if a topology on $X$ satisfies the property above for all spaces $Z$ and all functions $g:X\to Z$, then the topology on $X$ is the final topology with respect to the $f_i.$

=== Behavior under composition ===
Suppose $\mathcal{F} := \left\{ f_i:Y_i \to X \mid i \in I \right\}$ is a family of maps, and for every $i \in I,$ the topology $\upsilon_i$ on $Y_i$ is the final topology induced by some family $\mathcal{G}_i$ of maps valued in $Y_i$. Then the final topology on $X$ induced by $\mathcal{F}$ is equal to the final topology on $X$ induced by the maps $\left\{ f_i \circ g ~:~ i \in I \text{ and } g \in \cal G_i \right\}.$

As a consequence: if $\tau_{\mathcal{F}}$ is the final topology on $X$ induced by the family $\mathcal{F} := \left\{ f_i : i \in I \right\}$ and if $\pi : X \to (S, \sigma)$ is any surjective map valued in some topological space $(S, \sigma),$ then $\pi : \left(X, \tau_{\mathcal{F}}\right) \to (S, \sigma)$ is a quotient map if and only if $(S, \sigma)$ has the final topology induced by the maps $\left\{ \pi \circ f_i ~:~ i \in I \right\}.$

By the universal property of the disjoint union topology we know that given any family of continuous maps $f_i : Y_i \to X,$ there is a unique continuous map
$$f : \coprod_i Y_i \to X$$
that is compatible with the natural injections. If the family of maps $f_i$ covers $X$ (i.e. each $x \in X$ lies in the image of some $f_i$) then the map $f$ will be a quotient map if and only if $X$ has the final topology induced by the maps $f_i.$

=== Effects of changing the family of maps ===
Throughout, let $\mathcal{F} := \left\{ f_i : i \in I \right\}$ be a family of $X$-valued maps with each map being of the form $f_i : \left(Y_i, \upsilon_i\right) \to X$ and let $\tau_{\mathcal{F}}$ denote the final topology on $X$ induced by $\mathcal{F}.$ The definition of the final topology guarantees that for every index $i,$ the map $f_i : \left(Y_i, \upsilon_i\right) \to \left(X, \tau_{\mathcal{F}}\right)$ is continuous.

For any subset $\mathcal{S} \subseteq \mathcal{F},$ the final topology $\tau_{\mathcal{S}}$ on $X$ will be finer than (and possibly equal to) the topology $\tau_{\mathcal{F}}$; that is, $\mathcal{S} \subseteq \mathcal{F}$ implies $\tau_{\mathcal{F}} \subseteq \tau_{\mathcal{S}},$ where set equality might hold even if $\mathcal{S}$ is a proper subset of $\mathcal{F}.$

If $\tau$ is any topology on $X$ such that $\tau \neq \tau_{\mathcal{F}}$ and $f_i : \left(Y_i, \upsilon_i\right) \to (X, \tau)$ is continuous for every index $i \in I,$ then $\tau$ must be strictly coarser than $\tau_{\mathcal{F}}$ (meaning that $\tau \subseteq \tau_{\mathcal{F}}$ and $\tau \neq \tau_{\mathcal{F}};$ this will be written $\tau \subsetneq \tau_{\mathcal{F}}$) and moreover, for any subset $\mathcal{S} \subseteq \mathcal{F}$ the topology $\tau$ will also be strictly coarser than the final topology $\tau_{\mathcal{S}}$ that $\mathcal{S}$ induces on $X$ (because $\tau_{\mathcal{F}} \subseteq \tau_{\mathcal{S}}$); that is, $\tau \subsetneq \tau_{\mathcal{S}}.$

Suppose that in addition, $\mathcal{G} := \left\{g_a : a \in A\right\}$ is an $A$-indexed family of $X$-valued maps $g_a : Z_a \to X$ whose domains are topological spaces $\left(Z_a, \zeta_a\right).$ If every $g_a : \left(Z_a, \zeta_a\right) \to \left(X, \tau_{\mathcal{F}}\right)$ is continuous then adding these maps to the family $\mathcal{F}$ will not change the final topology on $X;$ that is, $\tau_{\mathcal{F} \cup \mathcal{G}} = \tau_{\mathcal{F}}.$ Explicitly, this means that the final topology on $X$ induced by the "extended family" $\mathcal{F} \cup \mathcal{G}$ is equal to the final topology $\tau_{\mathcal{F}}$ induced by the original family $\mathcal{F} = \left\{ f_i : i \in I \right\}.$ However, had there instead existed even just one map $g_{a_0}$ such that $g_{a_0} : \left(Z_{a_0}, \zeta_{a_0}\right) \to \left(X, \tau_{\mathcal{F}}\right)$ was not continuous, then the final topology $\tau_{\mathcal{F} \cup \mathcal{G}}$ on $X$ induced by the "extended family" $\mathcal{F} \cup \mathcal{G}$ would necessarily be strictly coarser than the final topology $\tau_{\mathcal{F}}$ induced by $\mathcal{F};$ that is, $\tau_{\mathcal{F} \cup \mathcal{G}} \subsetneq \tau_{\mathcal{F}}$ (see this footnote (Note: By definition, the map $g_{a_0} : \left(Z_{a_0}, \zeta_{a_0}\right) \to \left(X, \tau_{\mathcal{F}}\right)$ not being continuous means that there exists at least one open set $U \in \tau_{\mathcal{F}}$ such that $g_{a_0}^{-1}(U)$ is not open in $\left(Z_{a_0}, \zeta_{a_0}\right).$ In contrast, by definition of the final topology $\tau_{\mathcal{F} \cup \{g_{a_0}\}},$ the map $g_{a_0} : \left(Z_{a_0}, \zeta_{a_0}\right) \to \left(X, \tau_{\mathcal{F} \cup \{g_{a_0}\}}\right)$ must be continuous. So the reason why $\tau_{\mathcal{F} \cup \mathcal{G}}$ must be strictly coarser, rather than strictly finer, than $\tau_{\mathcal{F}}$ is because the failure of the map $g_{a_0} : \left(Z_{a_0}, \zeta_{a_0}\right) \to \left(X, \tau_{\mathcal{F}}\right)$ to be continuous necessitates that one or more open subsets of $\tau_{\mathcal{F}}$ must be "removed" in order for $g_{a_0}$ to become continuous. Thus $\tau_{\mathcal{F} \cup \{g_{a_0}\}}$ is just $\tau_{\mathcal{F}}$ but some open sets "removed" from $\tau_{\mathcal{F}}.$) for an explanation).

== Final topology on the direct limit of finite-dimensional Euclidean spaces ==
Let
$$\R^{\infty} ~:=~ \left\{ \left(x_1, x_2, \ldots\right) \in \R^{\N} ~:~ \text{ all but finitely many } x_i \text{ are equal to } 0 \right\},$$
denote the space of finite sequences, where $\R^{\N}$ denotes the space of all real sequences. For every natural number $n \in \N,$ let $\R^n$ denote the usual Euclidean space endowed with the Euclidean topology and let $\operatorname{In}_{\R^n} : \R^n \to \R^{\infty}$ denote the inclusion map defined by $\operatorname{In}_{\R^n}\left(x_1, \ldots, x_n\right) := \left(x_1, \ldots, x_n, 0, 0, \ldots\right)$ so that its image is
$$\operatorname{Im} \left(\operatorname{In}_{\R^n}\right)
= \left\{ \left(x_1, \ldots, x_n, 0, 0, \ldots\right) ~:~ x_1, \ldots, x_n \in \R \right\}
= \R^n \times \left\{ (0, 0, \ldots) \right\}$$
and consequently,
$$\R^{\infty} = \bigcup_{n \in \N} \operatorname{Im} \left(\operatorname{In}_{\R^n}\right).$$

Endow the set $\R^{\infty}$ with the final topology $\tau^{\infty}$ induced by the family $\mathcal{F} := \left\{ \; \operatorname{In}_{\R^n} ~:~ n \in \N \; \right\}$ of all inclusion maps. With this topology, $\R^{\infty}$ becomes a complete Hausdorff locally convex sequential topological vector space that is not a Fréchet–Urysohn space. The topology $\tau^{\infty}$ is strictly finer than the subspace topology induced on $\R^{\infty}$ by $\R^{\N},$ where $\R^{\N}$ is endowed with its usual product topology. Endow the image $\operatorname{Im} \left(\operatorname{In}_{\R^n}\right)$ with the final topology induced on it by the bijection $\operatorname{In}_{\R^n} : \R^n \to \operatorname{Im} \left(\operatorname{In}_{\R^n}\right);$ that is, it is endowed with the Euclidean topology transferred to it from $\R^n$ via $\operatorname{In}_{\R^n}.$ This topology on $\operatorname{Im} \left( \operatorname{In}_{\R^n} \right)$ is equal to the subspace topology induced on it by $\left(\R^{\infty}, \tau^{\infty}\right).$ A subset $S \subseteq \R^{\infty}$ is open (respectively, closed) in $\left(\R^{\infty}, \tau^{\infty}\right)$ if and only if for every $n \in \N,$ the set $S \cap \operatorname{Im} \left(\operatorname{In}_{\R^n}\right)$ is an open (respectively, closed) subset of $\operatorname{Im} \left(\operatorname{In}_{\R^n}\right).$ The topology $\tau^{\infty}$ is coherent with the family of subspaces $\mathbb{S} := \left\{ \; \operatorname{Im} \left(\operatorname{In}_{\R^n}\right) ~:~ n \in \N \; \right\}.$ This makes $\left(\R^{\infty}, \tau^{\infty}\right)$ into an LB-space. Consequently, if $v \in \R^{\infty}$ and $v_{\bull}$ is a sequence in $\R^{\infty}$ then $v_{\bull} \to v$ in $\left(\R^{\infty}, \tau^{\infty}\right)$ if and only if there exists some $n \in \N$ such that both $v$ and $v_{\bull}$ are contained in $\operatorname{Im} \left(\operatorname{In}_{\R^n}\right)$ and $v_{\bull} \to v$ in $\operatorname{Im} \left(\operatorname{In}_{\R^n}\right).$

Often, for every $n \in \N,$ the inclusion map $\operatorname{In}_{\R^n}$ is used to identify $\R^n$ with its image $\operatorname{Im} \left(\operatorname{In}_{\R^n}\right)$ in $\R^{\infty};$ explicitly, the elements $\left( x_1, \ldots, x_n \right) \in \R^n$ and $\left(x_1, \ldots, x_n, 0, 0, 0, \ldots\right)$ are identified together. Under this identification, $\left(\left(\R^{\infty}, \tau^{\infty}\right), \left(\operatorname{In}_{\R^n}\right)_{n \in \N}\right)$ becomes a direct limit of the direct system $\left(\left(\R^n\right)_{n \in \N}, \left(\operatorname{In}_{\R^m}^{\R^n}\right)_{m \leq n \text{ in } \N}, \N\right),$ where for every $m \leq n,$ the map $\operatorname{In}_{\R^m}^{\R^n} : \R^m \to \R^n$ is the inclusion map defined by $\operatorname{In}_{\R^m}^{\R^n}\left(x_1, \ldots, x_m\right) := \left(x_1, \ldots, x_m, 0, \ldots, 0\right),$ where there are $n - m$ trailing zeros.

== Categorical description ==
In the language of category theory, the final topology construction can be described as follows. Let $Y$ be a functor from a discrete category $J$ to the category of topological spaces Top that selects the spaces $Y_i$ for $i \in J.$ Let $\Delta$ be the diagonal functor from Top to the functor category Top^{J} (this functor sends each space $X$ to the constant functor to $X$). The comma category $(Y \,\downarrow\, \Delta)$ is then the category of co-cones from $Y,$ i.e. objects in $(Y \,\downarrow\, \Delta)$ are pairs $(X, f)$ where $f = (f_i : Y_i \to X)_{i \in J}$ is a family of continuous maps to $X.$ If $U$ is the forgetful functor from Top to Set and Δ′ is the diagonal functor from Set to Set^{J} then the comma category $\left(UY \,\downarrow\, \Delta^{\prime}\right)$ is the category of all co-cones from $UY.$ The final topology construction can then be described as a functor from $\left(UY \,\downarrow\, \Delta^{\prime}\right)$ to $(Y \,\downarrow\, \Delta).$ This functor is left adjoint to the corresponding forgetful functor.

== See also ==
- Direct limit – Special case of colimit in category theory
- Induced topology – Inherited topology
- Initial topology – Coarsest topology making certain functions continuous
- LB-space
- LF-space – Topological vector space
