= Category of topological spaces =

Category whose objects are topological spaces and whose morphisms are continuous maps

In mathematics, the category of topological spaces, often denoted $\mathbf{Top}$, is the category whose objects are topological spaces and whose morphisms are continuous maps. This is a category because the composition of two continuous maps is again continuous, and the identity function is continuous.

Some authors use the name $\mathbf{Top}$ for the categories with topological manifolds, with compactly generated spaces as objects and continuous maps as morphisms or with the category of compactly generated weak Hausdorff spaces.

== As a concrete category ==
Like many categories, the category $\mathbf{Top}$ is a concrete category, meaning its objects are sets with additional structure (i.e. topologies) and its morphisms are functions preserving this structure. There is a natural forgetful functor

$U:\mathbf{Top}\to\mathbf{Set}$

to the category of sets which assigns to each topological space the underlying set and to each continuous map the underlying function.

The forgetful functor $U$ has both a left adjoint

$D:\mathbf{Set}\to\mathbf{Top}$

which equips a given set with the discrete topology, and a right adjoint

$I:\mathbf{Set}\to\mathbf{Top}$

which equips a given set with the indiscrete topology. Both of these functors are, in fact, right inverses to $U$ (meaning that $UD$ and $UI$ are equal to the identity functor on $\mathbf{Set}$). Moreover, since any function between discrete or between indiscrete spaces is continuous, both of these functors give full embeddings of $\mathbf{Set}$ into $\mathbf{Top}$.

$\mathbf{Top}$ is also fiber-complete meaning that the category of all topologies on a given set $X$ (called the fiber of $U$ above $X$) forms a complete lattice when ordered by inclusion. The greatest element in this fiber is the discrete topology on $X$, while the least element is the indiscrete topology.

$\mathbf{Top}$ is the model of what is called a topological category. These categories are characterized by the fact that every structured source $(X \to UA_i)_I$ has a unique initial lift $( A \to A_i)_I$. In $\mathbf{Top}$ the initial lift is obtained by placing the initial topology on the source. Topological categories have many properties in common with $\mathbf{Top}$ (such as fiber-completeness, discrete and indiscrete functors, and unique lifting of limits).

== Limits and colimits ==
The category $\mathbf{Top}$ is both complete and cocomplete, which means that all small limits and colimits exist in $\mathbf{Top}$. In fact, the forgetful functor $U:\mathbf{Top}\to\mathbf{Set}$ uniquely lifts both limits and colimits and preserves them as well. Therefore, (co)limits in $\mathbf{Top}$ are given by placing topologies on the corresponding (co)limits in $\mathbf{Set}$.

Specifically, if $F$ is a diagram in $\mathbf{Top}$ and $(L,\varphi:L\to F)$ is a limit of $UF$ in $\mathbf{Set}$, the corresponding limit of $F$ in $\mathbf{Top}$ is obtained by placing the initial topology on $(L,\varphi:L\to F)$. Dually, colimits in $\mathbf{Top}$ are obtained by placing the final topology on the corresponding colimits in $\mathbf{Set}$.

Unlike many algebraic categories, the forgetful functor $U:\mathbf{Top}\to\mathbf{Set}$ does not create or reflect limits since there will typically be non-universal cones in $\mathbf{Top}$ covering universal cones in $\mathbf{Set}$.

Examples of limits and colimits in $\mathbf{Top}$ include:

- The empty set (considered as a topological space) is the initial object of $\mathbf{Top}$; any singleton topological space is a terminal object. There are thus no zero objects in $\mathbf{Top}$.
- The product in $\mathbf{Top}$ is given by the product topology on the Cartesian product. The coproduct is given by the disjoint union of topological spaces.
- The equalizer of a pair of morphisms is given by placing the subspace topology on the set-theoretic equalizer. Dually, the coequalizer is given by placing the quotient topology on the set-theoretic coequalizer.
- Direct limits and inverse limits are the set-theoretic limits with the final topology and initial topology respectively.
- Adjunction spaces are an example of pushouts in $\mathbf{Top}$.

== Other properties ==
- The monomorphisms in $\mathbf{Top}$ are the injective continuous maps, the epimorphisms are the surjective continuous maps, and the isomorphisms are the homeomorphisms.
- The extremal monomorphisms are (up to isomorphism) the subspace embeddings. In fact, in $\mathbf{Top}$ all extremal monomorphisms happen to satisfy the stronger property of being regular.
- The extremal epimorphisms are (essentially) the quotient maps. Every extremal epimorphism is regular.
- The split monomorphisms are (essentially) the inclusions of retracts into their ambient space.
- The split epimorphisms are (up to isomorphism) the continuous surjective maps of a space onto one of its retracts.
- There are no zero morphisms in $\mathbf{Top}$, and in particular the category is not preadditive.
- $\mathbf{Top}$ is not cartesian closed (and therefore also not a topos) since it does not have exponential objects for all spaces. When this feature is desired, one often restricts to the full subcategory of compactly generated Hausdorff spaces $\mathbf{CGHaus}$ or the category of compactly generated weak Hausdorff spaces. However, $\mathbf{Top}$ is contained in the exponential category of pseudotopologies, which is itself a subcategory of the (also exponential) category of convergence spaces.

== Relationships to other categories ==
- The category of pointed topological spaces $\mathbf{Top}$_{•} is a coslice category over $\mathbf{Top}$.
- The homotopy category $\mathbf{hTop}$ has topological spaces for objects and homotopy equivalence classes of continuous maps for morphisms. This is a quotient category of $\mathbf{Top}$. One can likewise form the pointed homotopy category $\mathbf{hTop}$_{•}.
- $\mathbf{Top}$ contains the important category $\mathbf{Haus}$ of Hausdorff spaces as a full subcategory. The added structure of this subcategory allows for more epimorphisms: in fact, the epimorphisms in this subcategory are precisely those morphisms with dense images in their codomains, so that epimorphisms need not be surjective.
- $\mathbf{Top}$ contains the full subcategory $\mathbf{CGHaus}$ of compactly generated Hausdorff spaces, which has the important property of being a Cartesian closed category while still containing all of the typical spaces of interest. This makes $\mathbf{CGHaus}$ a particularly convenient category of topological spaces that is often used in place of $\mathbf{Top}$.
- The forgetful functor to $\mathbf{Set}$ has both a left and a right adjoint, as described above in the concrete category section.
- There is a functor to the category of locales $\mathbf{Loc}$ sending a topological space to its locale of open sets. This functor has a right adjoint that sends each locale to its topological space of points. This adjunction restricts to an equivalence between the category of sober spaces and spatial locales.
- The homotopy hypothesis relates $\mathbf{Top}$ with $\mathbf{\infty Grpd}$, the category of ∞-groupoids. The conjecture states that ∞-groupoids are equivalent to topological spaces modulo weak homotopy equivalence.

== See also ==
- Category of groups – Category whose objects are groups and whose morphisms are group homomorphisms
- Category of metric spaces – Category whose objects are metric spaces and whose morphisms are metric maps
- Category of sets – Category whose objects are sets and whose morphisms are functions
- Category of topological spaces with base point – Topological space with a distinguished point
- Category of topological vector spaces
- Category of measurable spaces
- Categorical topology
