= Locally closed subset =

Intersection of an open set and a closed set

In topology, a branch of mathematics, a subset $E$ of a topological space $X$ is said to be locally closed if any of the following equivalent conditions are satisfied:

- $E$ is the intersection of an open set and a closed set in $X.$
- For each point $x\in E,$ there is a neighborhood $U$ of $x$ such that $E \cap U$ is closed in $U.$
- $E$ is open in its closure $\overline{E}.$
- The set $\overline{E}\setminus E$ is closed in $X.$
- $E$ is the difference of two closed sets in $X.$
- $E$ is the difference of two open sets in $X.$

The second condition justifies the terminology locally closed and is Bourbaki's definition of locally closed. To see the second condition implies the third, use the facts that for subsets $A \subseteq B,$ $A$ is closed in $B$ if and only if $A = \overline{A} \cap B$ and that for a subset $E$ and an open subset $U,$ $\overline{E} \cap U = \overline{E \cap U} \cap U.$

== Examples ==
The interval $(0, 1] = (0, 2) \cap [0, 1]$ is a locally closed subset of $\Reals.$ For another example, consider the relative interior $D$ of a closed disk in $\Reals^3.$ It is locally closed since it is an intersection of the closed disk and an open ball.

On the other hand, $\{ (x,y)\in\Reals^2 \mid x\ne0 \} \cup \{(0,0)\}$ is not a locally closed subset of $\Reals^2$.

Recall that, by definition, a submanifold $E$ of an $n$-manifold $M$ is a subset such that for each point $x$ in $E,$ there is a chart $\varphi : U \to \Reals^n$ around it such that $\varphi(E \cap U) = \Reals^k \cap \varphi(U).$ Hence, a submanifold is locally closed.

Here is an example in algebraic geometry. Let U be an open affine chart on a projective variety X (in the Zariski topology). Then each closed subvariety Y of U is locally closed in X; namely, $Y = U \cap \overline{Y}$ where $\overline{Y}$ denotes the closure of Y in X. (See also quasi-projective variety and quasi-affine variety.)

== Properties ==
Finite intersections and the pre-image under a continuous map of locally closed sets are locally closed. On the other hand, a union and a complement of locally closed subsets need not be locally closed. (This motivates the notion of a constructible set.)

Especially in stratification theory, for a locally closed subset $E,$ the complement $\overline{E} \setminus E$ is called the boundary of $E$ (not to be confused with topological boundary). If $E$ is a closed submanifold-with-boundary of a manifold $M,$ then the relative interior (that is, interior as a manifold) of $E$ is locally closed in $M$ and the boundary of it as a manifold is the same as the boundary of it as a locally closed subset.

A topological space is said to be submaximal if every subset is locally closed. See Glossary of topology#S for more of this notion.

== See also ==
- Countably generated space
