= Direct limit =

Special case of colimit in category theory

In mathematics, a direct limit is a way to construct a (typically large) object from many (typically smaller) objects that are put together in a specific way. These objects may be groups, rings, vector spaces or in general objects from any category. The way they are put together is specified by a system of homomorphisms (group homomorphism, ring homomorphism, or in general morphisms in the category) between those smaller objects. The direct limit of the objects $A_i$, where $i$ ranges over some directed set $I$, is denoted by $\varinjlim A_i$. This notation suppresses the system of homomorphisms; however, the limit depends on the system of homomorphisms.

Direct limits are a special case of the concept of colimit in category theory. Direct limits are dual to inverse limits, which are a special case of limits in category theory.

== Formal definition ==
We will first give the definition for algebraic structures like groups and modules, and then the general definition, which can be used in any category.

=== Direct limits of algebraic objects ===
In this section objects are understood to consist of underlying sets equipped with a given algebraic structure, such as groups, rings, modules (over a fixed ring), algebras (over a fixed field), etc. With this in mind, homomorphisms are understood in the corresponding setting (group homomorphisms, etc.).

Let $\langle I,\le\rangle$ be a directed set. Let $\{A_i : i\in I\}$ be a family of objects indexed by $I\,$ and $f_{ij}\colon A_i \rightarrow A_j$ be a homomorphism for all $i \le j$ with the following properties:

1. $f_{ii}\,$ is the identity on $A_i\,$, and
2. $f_{ik}= f_{jk}\circ f_{ij}$ for all $i\le j\le k$.

Then the pair $\langle A_i,f_{ij}\rangle$ is called a direct system over $I$.

The direct limit of the direct system $\langle A_i,f_{ij}\rangle$ is denoted by $\varinjlim A_i$ and is defined as follows. Its underlying set is the disjoint union of the $A_i$'s modulo a certain equivalence relation $\sim\,$:

$$\varinjlim A_i = \bigsqcup_i A_i\bigg/\sim.$$

Here, if $x_i\in A_i$ and $x_j\in A_j$, then $x_i\sim\, x_j$ if and only if there is some $k\in I$ with $i \le k$ and $j \le k$ such that $f_{ik}(x_i) = f_{jk}(x_j)\,$. Intuitively, two elements in the disjoint union are equivalent if and only if they "eventually become equal" in the direct system. An equivalent formulation that highlights the duality to the inverse limit is that an element is equivalent to all its images under the maps of the direct system, i.e. $x_i\sim\, f_{ij}(x_i)$ whenever $i \le j$.

One obtains from this definition canonical functions $\phi_j \colon A_j\rightarrow \varinjlim A_i$ sending each element to its equivalence class. The algebraic operations on $\varinjlim A_i\,$ are defined such that these maps become homomorphisms. Formally, the direct limit of the direct system $\langle A_i,f_{ij}\rangle$ consists of the object $\varinjlim A_i$ together with the canonical homomorphisms $\phi_j \colon A_j\rightarrow \varinjlim A_i$.

=== Direct limits in an arbitrary category ===
The direct limit can be defined in an arbitrary category $\mathcal{C}$ by means of a universal property. Let $\langle X_i, f_{ij}\rangle$ be a direct system of objects and morphisms in $\mathcal{C}$ (as defined above). A target is a pair $\langle X, \phi_i\rangle$ where $X\,$ is an object in $\mathcal{C}$ and $\phi_i\colon X_i\rightarrow X$ are morphisms for each $i\in I$ such that $\phi_i =\phi_j \circ f_{ij}$ whenever $i \le j$. A direct limit of the direct system $\langle X_i, f_{ij}\rangle$ is a universally repelling target $\langle X, \phi_i\rangle$ in the sense that $\langle X, \phi_i\rangle$ is a target and for each target $\langle Y, \psi_i\rangle$, there is a unique morphism $u\colon X\rightarrow Y$ such that $u\circ \phi_i=\psi_i$ for each i. The following diagram

will then commute for all i, j.

The direct limit is often denoted

$$X = \varinjlim X_i$$

with the direct system $\langle X_i, f_{ij}\rangle$ and the canonical morphisms $\phi_i$ (or, more precisely, canonical injections $\iota_i$) being understood.

Unlike for algebraic objects, not every direct system in an arbitrary category has a direct limit. If it does, however, the direct limit is unique in a strong sense: given another direct limit X′ there exists a unique isomorphism X′ → X that commutes with the canonical morphisms.

== Examples ==
- A collection of subsets $M_i$ of a set $M$ can be partially ordered by inclusion. If the collection is directed, its direct limit is the union $\bigcup M_i$.
- Similarly, the collection of finitely generated subgroups $H_i$ of a given group $G$ can be partially ordered by inclusion. Finite sets of finitely generated subgroups $\{\langle X_1\rangle, \langle X_2\rangle,\dots \langle X_n\rangle\}$ are containined in the finitely generated subgroup $\langle\cup X_i\rangle$, so the index set is indeed directed. With the inclusion morphisms $f_{i,j}:H_i\to H_j$, the direct limit is simply (isomorphic to) $G$. An analogous result holds for rings, modules, algebras, etc. Note the requirement of finite generation may be weakened, as long as the index set remains directed.
- The weak topology of a CW complex is defined as a direct limit.
- Let $I$ be any directed set with a greatest element $m$. The direct limit $X$ of any corresponding direct system is isomorphic to $X_m$ and the canonical morphism $\phi_m: X_m \rightarrow X$ is an isomorphism.
- Let K be a field. For a positive integer n, consider the general linear group GL(n;K) consisting of invertible n x n - matrices with entries from K. We have a group homomorphism GL(n;K) → GL(n+1;K) that enlarges matrices by putting a 1 in the lower right corner and zeros elsewhere in the last row and column. The direct limit of this system is the general linear group of K, written as GL(K). An element of GL(K) can be thought of as an infinite invertible matrix that differs from the infinite identity matrix in only finitely many entries. The group GL(K) is of vital importance in algebraic K-theory.
- Let p be a prime number. Consider the direct system composed of the factor groups $\mathbb{Z}/p^n\mathbb{Z}$ and the homomorphisms $\mathbb{Z}/p^{n}\mathbb{Z} \rightarrow \mathbb{Z}/p^{n+1}\mathbb{Z}$ induced by multiplication by $p$. The direct limit of this system consists of all the roots of unity of order some power of $p$, and is called the Prüfer group $\mathbb{Z}(p^\infty)$.
- There is a (non-obvious) injective ring homomorphism from the ring of symmetric polynomials in $n$ variables to the ring of symmetric polynomials in $n + 1$ variables. Forming the direct limit of this direct system yields the ring of symmetric functions.
- Let F be a C-valued sheaf on a topological space X. Fix a point x in X. The open neighborhoods of x form a directed set ordered by inclusion (U ≤ V if and only if U contains V). The corresponding direct system is (F(U), r_{U,V}) where r is the restriction map. The direct limit of this system is called the stalk of F at x, denoted F_{x}. For each neighborhood U of x, the canonical morphism F(U) → F_{x} associates to a section s of F over U an element s_{x} of the stalk F_{x} called the germ of s at x.
- Direct limits in the category of topological spaces are given by placing the final topology on the underlying set-theoretic direct limit.
- An ind-scheme is an inductive limit of schemes.

== Properties ==
Direct limits are linked to inverse limits via

$$\mathrm{Hom} (\varinjlim X_i, Y) = \varprojlim \mathrm{Hom} (X_i, Y).$$

An important property is that taking direct limits in the category of modules is an exact functor. This means that for any directed system of short exact sequences $0 \to A_i \to B_i \to C_i \to 0$, the sequence $0 \to \varinjlim A_i \to \varinjlim B_i \to \varinjlim C_i \to 0$ of direct limits is also exact.

== Related constructions and generalizations ==
We note that a direct system in a category $\mathcal{C}$ admits an alternative description in terms of functors. Any directed set $\langle I,\le \rangle$ can be considered as a small category $\mathcal{I}$ whose objects are the elements $I$ and there is a morphism $i\rightarrow j$ if and only if $i\le j$. A direct system over $I$ is then the same as a covariant functor $\mathcal{I}\rightarrow \mathcal{C}$. The colimit of this functor is the same as the direct limit of the original direct system.

A notion closely related to direct limits are the filtered colimits. Here we start with a covariant functor $\mathcal J \to \mathcal C$ from a filtered category $\mathcal J$ to some category $\mathcal{C}$ and form the colimit of this functor. One can show that a category has all directed limits if and only if it has all filtered colimits, and a functor defined on such a category commutes with all direct limits if and only if it commutes with all filtered colimits.

Given an arbitrary category $\mathcal{C}$, there may be direct systems in $\mathcal{C}$ that don't have a direct limit in $\mathcal{C}$ (consider for example the category of finite sets, or the category of finitely generated abelian groups). In this case, we can always embed $\mathcal{C}$ into a category $\text{Ind}(\mathcal{C})$ in which all direct limits exist; the objects of $\text{Ind}(\mathcal{C})$ are called ind-objects of $\mathcal{C}$.

The categorical dual of the direct limit is called the inverse limit. As above, inverse limits can be viewed as limits of certain functors and are closely related to limits over cofiltered categories.

== Terminology ==
In the literature, one finds the terms "directed limit", "direct inductive limit", "directed colimit", "direct colimit" and "inductive limit" for the concept of direct limit defined above. The term "inductive limit" is ambiguous however, as some authors use it for the general concept of colimit.

== See also ==
- Direct limits of groups
