= Disjoint union (topology) =

Mathematical term

In general topology and related areas of mathematics, the disjoint union (also called the direct sum, free union, free sum, topological sum, or coproduct) of a family of topological spaces is a space formed by equipping the disjoint union of the underlying sets with a natural topology called the disjoint union topology. Roughly speaking, in the disjoint union the given spaces are considered as part of a single new space where each looks as it would alone and they are isolated from each other.

The name coproduct originates from the fact that the disjoint union is the categorical dual of the product space construction.

== Definition ==
Let {X_{i} : i ∈ I} be a family of topological spaces indexed by I. Let
$$X = \coprod_i X_i$$
be the disjoint union of the underlying sets. For each i in I, let
$$\varphi_i : X_i \to X\,$$
be the canonical injection (defined by $\varphi_i(x)=(x,i)$). The disjoint union topology on X is defined as the finest topology on X for which all the canonical injections $\varphi_i$ are continuous (i.e.: it is the final topology on X induced by the canonical injections).

Explicitly, the disjoint union topology can be described as follows. A subset U of X is open in X if and only if its preimage $\varphi_i^{-1}(U)$ is open in X_{i} for each i ∈ I. Yet another formulation is that a subset V of X is open relative to X iff its intersection with X_{i} is open relative to X_{i} for each i.

== Properties ==
The disjoint union space X, together with the canonical injections, can be characterized by the following universal property: If Y is a topological space, and f_{i} : X_{i} → Y is a continuous map for each i ∈ I, then there exists precisely one continuous map f : X → Y such that the following set of diagrams commute:

Characteristic property of disjoint unions

This shows that the disjoint union is the coproduct in the category of topological spaces. It follows from the above universal property that a map f : X → Y is continuous iff f_{i} = f o φ_{i} is continuous for all i in I.

In addition to being continuous, the canonical injections φ_{i} : X_{i} → X are open and closed maps. It follows that the injections are topological embeddings so that each X_{i} may be canonically thought of as a subspace of X.

== Examples ==
If each X_{i} is homeomorphic to a fixed space A, then the disjoint union X is homeomorphic to the product space A × I where I has the discrete topology.

== Preservation of topological properties ==
- Every disjoint union of discrete spaces is discrete
- Separation
  - Every disjoint union of T_{0} spaces is T_{0}
  - Every disjoint union of T_{1} spaces is T_{1}
  - Every disjoint union of Hausdorff spaces is Hausdorff
- Connectedness
  - The disjoint union of two or more nonempty topological spaces is disconnected

== See also ==
- product topology, the dual construction
- subspace topology and its dual quotient topology
- topological union, a generalization to the case where the pieces are not disjoint
