= Comparison of topologies =

Mathematical concept

In topology and related areas of mathematics, the set of all possible topologies on a given set forms a partially ordered set. This order relation can be used for comparison of the topologies.

== Definition ==
A topology on a set may be defined as the collection of subsets which are considered to be "open". (An alternative definition is that it is the collection of subsets which are considered "closed". These two ways of defining the topology are essentially equivalent because the complement of an open set is closed and vice versa. In the following, it doesn't matter which definition is used.)

For definiteness the reader should think of a topology as the family of open sets of a topological space, since that is the standard meaning of the word "topology".

Let τ_{1} and τ_{2} be two topologies on a set X such that τ_{1} is contained in τ_{2}:

$$\tau_1 \subseteq \tau_2$$.

That is, every element of τ_{1} is also an element of τ_{2}. Then the topology τ_{1} is said to be a coarser (weaker or smaller) topology than τ_{2}, and τ_{2} is said to be a finer (stronger or larger) topology than τ_{1}. (Note: There are some authors, especially analysts, who use the terms weak and strong with opposite meaning. (Munkres 2000, p. 78))

If additionally
$$\tau_1 \neq \tau_2$$
we say τ_{1} is strictly coarser than τ_{2} and τ_{2} is strictly finer than τ_{1}.

The binary relation ⊆ defines a partial ordering relation on the set of all possible topologies on X.

== Examples ==
The finest topology on X is the discrete topology; this topology makes all subsets open. The coarsest topology on X is the trivial topology; this topology only admits the empty set and the whole space as open sets.

In function spaces and spaces of measures there are often a number of possible topologies. See topologies on the set of operators on a Hilbert space for some intricate relationships.

All possible polar topologies on a dual pair are finer than the weak topology and coarser than the strong topology.

The complex vector space C^{n} may be equipped with either its usual (Euclidean) topology, or its Zariski topology. In the latter, a subset V of C^{n} is closed if and only if it consists of all solutions to some system of polynomial equations. Since any such V also is a closed set in the ordinary sense, but not vice versa, the Zariski topology is strictly weaker than the ordinary one.

== Properties ==
Let τ_{1} and τ_{2} be two topologies on a set X. Then the following statements are equivalent:

- τ_{1} ⊆ τ_{2}.
- The identity map id_{X} : (X, τ_{2}) → (X, τ_{1}) is a continuous map.
- The identity map id_{X} : (X, τ_{1}) → (X, τ_{2}) is a strongly open map.
- The identity map id_{X} : (X, τ_{1}) → (X, τ_{2}) is a relatively open map.

(The identity map id_{X} is surjective and therefore it is strongly open if and only if it is relatively open.)

Two immediate corollaries of the above equivalent statements are

- A continuous map f : X → Y remains continuous if the topology on Y becomes coarser or the topology on X finer.
- An open (resp. closed) map f : X → Y remains open (resp. closed) if the topology on Y becomes finer or the topology on X coarser.

One can also compare topologies using neighborhood bases. Let τ_{1} and τ_{2} be two topologies on a set X and let B_{i}(x) be a local base for the topology τ_{i} at x ∈ X for i = 1,2. Then τ_{1} ⊆ τ_{2} if and only if for all x ∈ X, each open set U_{1} in B_{1}(x) contains some open set U_{2} in B_{2}(x). Intuitively, this makes sense: a finer topology should have smaller neighborhoods.

== Lattice of topologies ==
The set of all topologies on a set X together with the partial ordering relation ⊆ forms a complete lattice that is also closed under arbitrary intersections. That is, any collection of topologies on X have a meet (or infimum) and a join (or supremum). The meet of a collection of topologies is the intersection of those topologies. The join, however, is not generally the union of those topologies (the union of two topologies need not be a topology) but rather the topology generated by the union.

Every complete lattice is also a bounded lattice, which is to say that it has a greatest and least element. In the case of topologies, the greatest element is the discrete topology and the least element is the trivial topology.

The lattice of topologies on a set $X$ is a complemented lattice; that is, given a topology $\tau$ on $X$ there exists a topology $\tau'$ on $X$ such that the intersection $\tau\cap\tau'$ is the trivial topology and the topology generated by the union $\tau\cup\tau'$ is the discrete topology.

If the set $X$ has at least three elements, the lattice of topologies on $X$ is not modular, and hence not distributive either.

== See also ==
- Initial topology, the coarsest topology on a set to make a family of mappings from that set continuous
- Final topology, the finest topology on a set to make a family of mappings into that set continuous
