= Nenosuke Funayama =

Japanese mathematician specializing in lattice theory

- 船山 子之助
- Known for: Lattice theory; Funayama–Nakayama theorem; Funayama's theorem
- Scientific career
- Fields: Mathematics
- Workplaces: Yamagata University

Nenosuke Funayama (船山 子之助, Funayama Nenosuke) was a Japanese mathematician known for his contributions to order theory, particularly lattice theory, distributive lattices, lattice congruences, and the embedding of lattices into Boolean algebras. He is best known for the Funayama–Nakayama theorem, established jointly with Tadashi Nakayama in 1942, and for Funayama's theorem on the embedding of infinitely distributive lattices into complete Boolean algebras, published in 1959.

Funayama was affiliated with Yamagata University, as recorded in his publications in the Nagoya Mathematical Journal in 1959 and 1966.

== Mathematical work ==
=== Congruence lattices ===
In 1942, Funayama published a paper entitled "On the Congruence Relations on Lattices", investigating the structure of congruence relations on lattices.

Later that year, Funayama and Tadashi Nakayama published "On the Distributivity of a Lattice of Lattice-congruences". They proved that the congruence lattice of every lattice is distributive, a result subsequently known as the Funayama–Nakayama theorem.

For a lattice $L$, let $\operatorname{Con}(L)$ denote the lattice of its congruence relations, ordered by inclusion. The theorem states that $\operatorname{Con}(L)$ is distributive, even when $L$ itself is not distributive.

This result became an important starting point for the congruence lattice problem, which concerns the characterization of lattices representable as congruence lattices of other lattices.

=== Completion of distributive lattices ===
In 1944, Funayama investigated the Dedekind–MacNeille completion, also known as completion by cuts, of distributive lattices.

In his paper "On the Completion by Cuts of Distributive Lattices", he constructed an example showing that the completion by cuts of a distributive lattice need not be modular, and therefore need not be distributive. This example is called Funayama's lattice.

Funayama also established a necessary and sufficient condition for the completion by cuts of a distributive lattice to remain distributive.

His work on the completion of distributive lattices was subsequently extended by other researchers.

=== Lattice embeddings and infinite distributivity ===
In 1956, Funayama published "Imbedding Partly Ordered Sets into Infinitely Distributive Complete Lattices", investigating the embedding of partially ordered sets into complete lattices satisfying infinite distributive laws.

In 1959, he established a characterization of lattices admitting embeddings into complete Boolean algebras that preserve all existing joins and meets. The result became known as Funayama's theorem.

The theorem states that a lattice $L$ can be embedded into a complete Boolean algebra in such a way that all existing suprema and infima are preserved if and only if $L$ satisfies both the join-infinite and meet-infinite distributive laws.

These laws require, whenever the indicated supremum or infimum exists, that

$$a\wedge\bigvee S=\bigvee_{s\in S}(a\wedge s)$$

and

$$a\vee\bigwedge S=\bigwedge_{s\in S}(a\vee s)$$,

respectively, for every element $a$ and subset $S$ of the lattice. The laws also require the expressions on the right-hand sides to exist.

The theorem strengthens the classical result that every distributive lattice embeds into a Boolean algebra, since ordinary lattice embeddings need only preserve finite joins and meets.

Funayama's theorem has remained a subject of mathematical research. In 2013, Guram Bezhanishvili, David Gabelaia, and Mamuka Jibladze revisited the theorem and studied its relationship with Priestley duality and complete lattice embeddings.

In 2026, Guram Bezhanishvili and Wesley H. Holliday presented another proof of the theorem using order-theoretic methods, together with generalizations of the original result.

=== Ring theory ===
Funayama also contributed to ring theory. In 1966, he published "Imbedding a Regular Ring in a Regular Ring with Identity", concerning the embedding of von Neumann regular rings into regular rings possessing a multiplicative identity.

== Selected publications ==
- Funayama, N. (1942). "On the Congruence Relations on Lattices". Proceedings of the Imperial Academy, 18(9), 530–531. doi:10.3792/pia/1195573780.
- Funayama, N.; Nakayama, T. (1942). "On the Distributivity of a Lattice of Lattice-congruences". Proceedings of the Imperial Academy, 18(9), 553–554. doi:10.3792/pia/1195573786.
- Funayama, N. (1944). "On the Completion by Cuts of Distributive Lattices". Proceedings of the Imperial Academy, 20(1), 1–2. doi:10.3792/pia/1195573210.
- Funayama, N. (1956). "Imbedding Partly Ordered Sets into Infinitely Distributive Complete Lattices". Tohoku Mathematical Journal, 8(1), 54–62. doi:10.2748/tmj/1178245008.
- Funayama, N. (1959). "Imbedding Infinitely Distributive Lattices Completely Isomorphically into Boolean Algebras". Nagoya Mathematical Journal, 15, 71–81. doi:10.1017/S0027763000006681.
- Funayama, N. (1966). "Imbedding a Regular Ring in a Regular Ring with Identity". Nagoya Mathematical Journal, 27(1), 61–64. doi:10.1017/S0027763000011867.

== See also ==
- Distributive lattice
- Complete Boolean algebra
- Congruence lattice problem
- Dedekind–MacNeille completion
- Lattice theory
