= Congruence lattice problem =

Important problem in lattice theory

In mathematics, the congruence lattice problem asks whether every algebraic distributive lattice is isomorphic to the congruence lattice of some other lattice. The problem was posed by Robert P. Dilworth, and for many years it was one of the most famous and long-standing open problems in lattice theory; it had a deep impact on the development of lattice theory itself. The conjecture that every distributive lattice is a congruence lattice is true for all distributive lattices with at most ℵ_{1} compact elements, but F. Wehrung provided a counterexample for distributive lattices with ℵ_{2} compact elements using a construction based on Kuratowski's free set theorem.

== Preliminaries ==
We denote by Con A the congruence lattice of an algebra A, that is, the lattice of all congruences of A under inclusion.

The following is a universal-algebraic triviality. It says that for a congruence, being finitely generated is a lattice-theoretical property.

Lemma. A congruence of an algebra A is finitely generated if and only if it is a compact element of Con A.

As every congruence of an algebra is the join of the finitely generated congruences below it (e.g., every submodule of a module is the union of all its finitely generated submodules), we obtain the following result, first published by Birkhoff and Frink in 1948.

Theorem (Birkhoff and Frink 1948). The congruence lattice Con A of any algebra A is an algebraic lattice.

While congruences of lattices lose something in comparison to groups, modules, rings (they cannot be identified with subsets of the universe), they also have a property unique among all the other structures encountered yet.

Theorem (Funayama and Nakayama 1942). The congruence lattice of any lattice is distributive.

This says that α ∧ (β ∨ γ) = (α ∧ β) ∨ (α ∧ γ), for any congruences α, β, and γ of a given lattice. The analogue of this result fails, for instance, for modules, as $A\cap(B+C)\neq(A\cap B)+(A\cap C)$, as a rule, for submodules A, B, C of a given module.

Soon after this result, Dilworth proved the following result. He did not publish the result but it appears as an exercise credited to him in Birkhoff 1948. The first published proof is in Grätzer and Schmidt 1962.

Theorem (Dilworth ≈1940, Grätzer and Schmidt 1962). Every finite distributive lattice is isomorphic to the congruence lattice of some finite lattice.

It is important to observe that the solution lattice found in Grätzer and Schmidt's proof is sectionally complemented, that is, it has a least element (true for any finite lattice) and for all elements a ≤ b there exists an element x with a ∨ x = b and a ∧ x = 0. It is also in that paper that CLP is first stated in published form, although it seems that the earliest attempts at CLP were made by Dilworth himself. Congruence lattices of finite lattices have been given an enormous amount of attention, for which a reference is Grätzer's 2005 monograph.

The congruence lattice problem (CLP): Is every distributive algebraic lattice isomorphic to the congruence lattice of some lattice?

The problem CLP has been one of the most intriguing and longest-standing open problems of lattice theory. Some related results of universal algebra are the following.

Theorem (Grätzer and Schmidt 1963). Every algebraic lattice is isomorphic to the congruence lattice of some algebra.

The lattice Sub V of all subspaces of a vector space V is certainly an algebraic lattice. As the next result shows, these algebraic lattices are difficult to represent.

Theorem (Freese, Lampe, and Taylor 1979). Let V be an infinite-dimensional vector space over an uncountable field F. Then Con A isomorphic to Sub V implies that A has at least card F operations, for any algebra A.

As V is infinite-dimensional, the largest element (unit) of Sub V is not compact. However innocuous it sounds, the compact unit assumption is essential in the statement of the result above, as demonstrated by the following result.

Theorem (Lampe 1982). Every algebraic lattice with compact unit is isomorphic to the congruence lattice of some groupoid.

== Semilattice formulation of CLP ==
The congruence lattice Con A of an algebra A is an algebraic lattice. The (∨,0)-semilattice of compact elements of Con A is denoted by Con_{c} A, and it is sometimes called the congruence semilattice of A. Then Con A is isomorphic to the ideal lattice of Con_{c} A. By using the classical equivalence between the category of all (∨,0)-semilattices and the category of all algebraic lattices (with suitable definitions of morphisms), as it is outlined here, we obtain the following semilattice-theoretical formulation of CLP.

Semilattice-theoretical formulation of CLP: Is every distributive (∨,0)-semilattice isomorphic to the congruence semilattice of some lattice?

Say that a distributive (∨,0)-semilattice is representable, if it is isomorphic to Con_{c} L, for some lattice L. So CLP asks whether every distributive (∨,0)-semilattice is representable.

Many investigations around this problem involve diagrams of semilattices or of algebras. A most useful folklore result about these is the following.

Theorem. The functor Con_{c}, defined on all algebras of a given signature, to all (∨,0)-semilattices, preserves direct limits.

== Schmidt's approach via distributive join-homomorphisms ==
We say that a (∨,0)-semilattice satisfies Schmidt's Condition, if it is isomorphic to the quotient of a generalized Boolean semilattice B under some distributive join-congruence of B. One of the deepest results about representability of (∨,0)-semilattices is the following.

Theorem (Schmidt 1968). Any (∨,0)-semilattice satisfying Schmidt's Condition is representable.

This raised the following problem, stated in the same paper.

Problem 1 (Schmidt 1968). Does any (∨,0)-semilattice satisfy Schmidt's Condition?

Partial positive answers are the following.

Theorem (Schmidt 1981). Every distributive lattice with zero satisfies Schmidt's Condition; thus it is representable.

This result has been improved further as follows, via a very long and technical proof, using forcing and Boolean-valued models.

Theorem (Wehrung 2003). Every direct limit of a countable sequence of distributive lattices with zero and (∨,0)-homomorphisms is representable.

Other important representability results are related to the cardinality of the semilattice. The following result was prepared for publication by Dobbertin after Huhn's death in 1985. The two corresponding papers were published in 1989.

Theorem (Huhn 1985). Every distributive (∨,0)-semilattice of cardinality at most ℵ_{1} satisfies Schmidt's Condition. Thus it is representable.

By using different methods, Dobbertin got the following result.

Theorem (Dobbertin 1986). Every distributive (∨,0)-semilattice in which every principal ideal is at most countable is representable.

Problem 2 (Dobbertin 1983). Is every conical refinement monoid measurable?

== Pudlák's approach; lifting diagrams of (∨,0)-semilattices ==
The approach of CLP suggested by Pudlák in his 1985 paper is different. It is based on the following result, Fact 4, p. 100 in Pudlák's 1985 paper, obtained earlier by Yuri L. Ershov as the main theorem in Section 3 of the Introduction of his 1977 monograph.

Theorem (Ershov 1977, Pudlák 1985). Every distributive (∨,0)-semilattice is the directed union of its finite distributive (∨,0)-subsemilattices.

This means that every finite subset in a distributive (∨,0)-semilattice S is contained in some finite distributive (∨,0)-subsemilattice of S. Now we are trying to represent a given distributive (∨,0)-semilattice S as Con_{c} L, for some lattice L. Writing S as a directed union $S=\bigcup(S_i\mid i\in I)$ of finite distributive (∨,0)-subsemilattices, we are hoping to represent each S_{i} as the congruence lattice of a lattice L_{i} with lattice homomorphisms f_{i}^{j} : L_{i}→ L_{j}, for i ≤ j in I, such that the diagram $\mathcal{S}$ of all S_{i} with all inclusion maps S_{i}→S_{j}, for i ≤ j in I, is naturally equivalent to $(\mathrm{Con_c}\,L_i,\mathrm{Con_c}\,f_i^j\mid i\leq j\text{ in }I)$, we say that the diagram $(L_i,f_i^j\mid i\leq j\text{ in }I)$ lifts $\mathcal{S}$ (with respect to the Con_{c} functor). If this can be done, then, as we have seen that the Con_{c} functor preserves direct limits, the direct limit $L=\varinjlim_{i\in I}L_i$ satisfies ${\rm Con_c}\,L\cong S$.

While the problem whether this could be done in general remained open for about 20 years, Pudlák could prove it for distributive lattices with zero, thus extending one of Schmidt's results by providing a functorial solution.

Theorem (Pudlák 1985). There exists a direct limits preserving functor Φ, from the category of all distributive lattices with zero and 0-lattice embeddings to the category of all lattices with zero and 0-lattice embeddings, such that Con_{c}Φ is naturally equivalent to the identity. Furthermore, Φ(S) is a finite atomistic lattice, for any finite distributive (∨,0)-semilattice S.

This result is improved further, by an even far more complex construction, to locally finite, sectionally complemented modular lattices by Růžička in 2004 and 2006.

Pudlák asked in 1985 whether his result above could be extended to the whole category of distributive (∨,0)-semilattices with (∨,0)-embeddings. The problem remained open until it was recently solved in the negative by Tůma and Wehrung.

Theorem (Tůma and Wehrung 2006). There exists a diagram D of finite Boolean (∨,0)-semilattices and (∨,0,1)-embeddings, indexed by a finite partially ordered set, that cannot be lifted, with respect to the Con_{c} functor, by any diagram of lattices and lattice homomorphisms.

In particular, this implies immediately that CLP has no functorial solution. Furthermore, it follows from deep 1998 results of universal algebra by Kearnes and Szendrei in so-called commutator theory of varieties that the result above can be extended from the variety of all lattices to any variety $\mathcal{V}$ such that all Con A, for $A\in\mathcal{V}$, satisfy a fixed nontrivial identity in the signature (∨,∧) (in short, with a nontrivial congruence identity).

We should also mention that many attempts at CLP were also based on the following result, first proved by Bulman-Fleming and McDowell in 1978 by using a categorical 1974 result of Shannon, see also Goodearl and Wehrung in 2001 for a direct argument.

Theorem (Bulman-Fleming and McDowell 1978). Every distributive (∨,0)-semilattice is a direct limit of finite Boolean (∨,0)-semilattices and (∨,0)-homomorphisms.

It should be observed that while the transition homomorphisms used in the Ershov-Pudlák Theorem are (∨,0)-embeddings, the transition homomorphisms used in the result above are not necessarily one-to-one, for example when one tries to represent the three-element chain. Practically this does not cause much trouble, and makes it possible to prove the following results.

Theorem. Every distributive (∨,0)-semilattice of cardinality at most ℵ_{1} is isomorphic to

(1) Con_{c} L, for some locally finite, relatively complemented modular lattice L (Tůma 1998 and Grätzer, Lakser, and Wehrung 2000).

(2) The semilattice of finitely generated two-sided ideals of some (not necessarily unital) von Neumann regular ring (Wehrung 2000).

(3) Con_{c} L, for some sectionally complemented modular lattice L (Wehrung 2000).

(4) The semilattice of finitely generated normal subgroups of some locally finite group (Růžička, Tůma, and Wehrung 2007).

(5) The submodule lattice of some right module over a (non-commutative) ring (Růžička, Tůma, and Wehrung 2007).

== Congruence lattices of lattices and nonstable K-theory of von Neumann regular rings ==
We recall that for a (unital, associative) ring R, we denote by V(R) the (conical, commutative) monoid of isomorphism classes of finitely generated projective right R-modules, see here for more details. Recall that if R is von Neumann regular, then V(R) is a refinement monoid. Denote by Id_{c} R the (∨,0)-semilattice of finitely generated two-sided ideals of R. We denote by L(R) the lattice of all principal right ideals of a von Neumann regular ring R. It is well known that L(R) is a complemented modular lattice.

The following result was observed by Wehrung, building on earlier works mainly by Jónsson and Goodearl.

Theorem (Wehrung 1999). Let R be a von Neumann regular ring. Then the (∨,0)-semilattices Id_{c} R and Con_{c} L(R) are both isomorphic to the maximal semilattice quotient of V(R).

Bergman proves in a well-known unpublished note from 1986 that any at most countable distributive (∨,0)-semilattice is isomorphic to Id_{c} R, for some locally matricial ring R (over any given field). This result is extended to semilattices of cardinality at most ℵ_{1} in 2000 by Wehrung, by keeping only the regularity of R (the ring constructed by the proof is not locally matricial). The question whether R could be taken locally matricial in the ℵ_{1} case remained open for a while, until it was disproved by Wehrung in 2004. Translating back to the lattice world by using the theorem above and using a lattice-theoretical analogue of the V(R) construction, called the dimension monoid, introduced by Wehrung in 1998, yields the following result.

Theorem (Wehrung 2004). There exists a distributive (∨,0,1)-semilattice of cardinality ℵ_{1} that is not isomorphic to Con_{c} L, for any modular lattice L every finitely generated sublattice of which has finite length.

Problem 3 (Goodearl 1991). Is the positive cone of any dimension group with order-unit isomorphic to V(R), for some von Neumann regular ring R?

== A first application of Kuratowski's free set theorem ==
The abovementioned Problem 1 (Schmidt), Problem 2 (Dobbertin), and Problem 3 (Goodearl) were solved simultaneously in the negative in 1998.

Theorem (Wehrung 1998). There exists a dimension vector space G over the rationals with order-unit whose positive cone G^{+} is not isomorphic to V(R), for any von Neumann regular ring R, and is not measurable in Dobbertin's sense. Furthermore, the maximal semilattice quotient of G^{+} does not satisfy Schmidt's Condition. Furthermore, G can be taken of any given cardinality greater than or equal to ℵ_{2}.

It follows from the previously mentioned works of Schmidt, Huhn, Dobbertin, Goodearl, and Handelman that the ℵ_{2} bound is optimal in all three negative results above.

As the ℵ_{2} bound suggests, infinite combinatorics are involved. The principle used is Kuratowski's free set theorem, first published in 1951. Only the case n=2 is used here.

The semilattice part of the result above is achieved via an infinitary semilattice-theoretical statement URP (Uniform Refinement Property). If we want to disprove Schmidt's problem, the idea is (1) to prove that any generalized Boolean semilattice satisfies URP (which is easy), (2) that URP is preserved under homomorphic image under a weakly distributive homomorphism (which is also easy), and (3) that there exists a distributive (∨,0)-semilattice of cardinality ℵ_{2} that does not satisfy URP (which is difficult, and uses Kuratowski's free set theorem).

Schematically, the construction in the theorem above can be described as follows. For a set Ω, we consider the partially ordered vector space E(Ω) defined by generators 1 and a_{i,x}, for i<2 and x in Ω, and relations a_{0,x}+a_{1,x}=1, a_{0,x} ≥ 0, and a_{1,x} ≥ 0, for any x in Ω. By using a Skolemization of the theory of dimension groups, we can embed E(Ω) functorially into a dimension vector space F(Ω). The vector space counterexample of the theorem above is G=F(Ω), for any set Ω with at least ℵ_{2} elements.

This counterexample has been modified subsequently by Ploščica and Tůma to a direct semilattice construction. For a (∨,0)-semilattice, the larger semilattice R(S) is the (∨,0)-semilattice freely generated by new elements t(a,b,c), for a, b, c in S such that c ≤ a ∨ b, subjected to the only relations c=t(a,b,c) ∨ t(b,a,c) and t(a,b,c) ≤ a. Iterating this construction gives the free distributive extension $D(S)=\bigcup(R^n(S)\mid n<\omega)$ of S. Now, for a set Ω, let L(Ω) be the (∨,0)-semilattice defined by generators 1 and a_{i,x}, for i<2 and x in Ω, and relations a_{0,x} ∨ a_{1,x}=1, for any x in Ω. Finally, put G(Ω)=D(L(Ω)).

In most related works, the following uniform refinement property is used. It is a modification of the one introduced by Wehrung in 1998 and 1999.

Definition (Ploščica, Tůma, and Wehrung 1998). Let e be an element in a (∨,0)-semilattice S. We say that the weak uniform refinement property WURP holds at e, if for all families $(a_i)_{i\in I}$ and $(b_i)_{i\in I}$ of elements in S such that a_{i} ∨ b_{i}=e for all i in I, there exists a family $(c_{i,j}\mid (i,j)\in I\times I)$ of elements of S such that the relations

• c_{i,j} ≤ a_{i},b_{j},

• c_{i,j} ∨ a_{j} ∨ b_{i}=e,

• c_{i,k} ≤ c_{i,j}∨ c_{j,k}

hold for all i, j, k in I. We say that S satisfies WURP, if WURP holds at every element of S.

By building on Wehrung's abovementioned work on dimension vector spaces, Ploščica and Tůma proved that WURP does not hold in G(Ω), for any set Ω of cardinality at least ℵ_{2}. Hence G(Ω) does not satisfy Schmidt's Condition. All negative representation results mentioned here always make use of some uniform refinement property, including the first one about dimension vector spaces.

However, the semilattices used in these negative results are relatively complicated. The following result, proved by Ploščica, Tůma, and Wehrung in 1998, is more striking, because it shows examples of representable semilattices that do not satisfy Schmidt's Condition. We denote by F_{V}(Ω) the free lattice on Ω in V, for any variety V of lattices.

Theorem (Ploščica, Tůma, and Wehrung 1998). The semilattice Con_{c} F_{V}(Ω) does not satisfy WURP, for any set Ω of cardinality at least ℵ_{2} and any non-distributive variety V of lattices. Consequently, Con_{c} F_{V}(Ω) does not satisfy Schmidt's Condition.

It is proved by Tůma and Wehrung in 2001 that Con_{c} F_{V}(Ω) is not isomorphic to Con_{c} L, for any lattice L with permutable congruences. By using a slight weakening of WURP, this result is extended to arbitrary algebras with permutable congruences by Růžička, Tůma, and Wehrung in 2007. Hence, for example, if Ω has at least ℵ_{2} elements, then Con_{c} F_{V}(Ω) is not isomorphic to the normal subgroup lattice of any group, or the submodule lattice of any module.

== Solving CLP: the Erosion Lemma ==
The following recent theorem solves CLP.

Theorem (Wehrung 2007). The semilattice G(Ω) is not isomorphic to Con_{c} L for any lattice L, whenever the set Ω has at least ℵ_{ω+1} elements.

Hence, the counterexample to CLP had been known for nearly ten years, it is just that nobody knew why it worked! All the results prior to the theorem above made use of some form of permutability of congruences. The difficulty was to find enough structure in congruence lattices of non-congruence-permutable lattices.

We shall denote by ε the `parity function' on the natural numbers, that is, ε(n)=n mod 2, for any natural number n.

We let L be an algebra possessing a structure of semilattice (L,∨) such that every congruence of L is also a congruence for the operation ∨ . We put

$$U\vee V=\{u\vee v \mid (u,v)\in U\times V\},\quad
\text{for all }U,V\subseteq L,$$

and we denote by Con_{c}^{U} L the (∨,0)-subsemilattice of Con_{c} L generated by all principal congruences Θ(u,v) ( = least congruence of L that identifies u and v), where (u,v) belongs to U ×U. We put Θ^{+}(u,v)=Θ(u ∨ v,v), for all u, v in L.br />

The Erosion Lemma (Wehrung 2007). Let x_{0}, x_{1} in L and let $Z=\{z_0,z_1,\dots,z_n\}$, for a positive integer n, be a finite subset of L with $\bigvee_{i<n}z_i\leq z_n$. Put

$$\alpha_j=\bigvee(\Theta_L(z_i,z_{i+1})\mid i<n,\ \varepsilon(i)=j),\text{ for all }j<2.$$

Then there are congruences $\theta_j\in\mathrm{Con_c}^{\{x_j\}\vee Z}L$, for j<2, such that

$$z_0\vee x_0\vee x_1\equiv z_n\vee x_0\vee x_1
\pmod{\theta_0\vee\theta_1}\quad\text{and}\quad
\theta_j\subseteq\alpha_j\cap\Theta_L^+(z_n,x_j),\text{ for all }j<2.$$

(Observe the faint formal similarity with first-order resolution in mathematical logic. Could this analogy be pushed further?)

The proof of the theorem above runs by setting a structure theorem for congruence lattices of semilattices—namely, the Erosion Lemma, against non-structure theorems for free distributive extensions G(Ω), the main one being called the Evaporation Lemma. While the latter are technically difficult, they are, in some sense, predictable. Quite to the contrary, the proof of the Erosion Lemma is elementary and easy, so it is probably the strangeness of its statement that explains that it has been hidden for so long.

More is, in fact, proved in the theorem above: For any algebra L with a congruence-compatible structure of join-semilattice with unit and for any set Ω with at least ℵ_{ω+1} elements, there is no weakly distributive homomorphism μ: Con_{c} L → G(Ω) containing 1 in its range. In particular, CLP was, after all, not a problem of lattice theory, but rather of universal algebra—even more specifically, semilattice theory! These results can also be translated in terms of a uniform refinement property, denoted by CLR in Wehrung's paper presenting the solution of CLP, which is noticeably more complicated than WURP.

Finally, the cardinality bound ℵ_{ω+1} has been improved to the optimal bound ℵ_{2} by Růžička.

Theorem (Růžička 2008). The semilattice G(Ω) is not isomorphic to Con_{c} L for any lattice L, whenever the set Ω has at least ℵ_{2} elements.

Růžička's proof follows the main lines of Wehrung's proof, except that it introduces an enhancement of Kuratowski's Free Set Theorem, called there existence of free trees, which it uses in the final argument involving the Erosion Lemma.

== A positive representation result for distributive semilattices ==
The proof of the negative solution for CLP shows that the problem of representing distributive semilattices by compact congruences of lattices already appears for congruence lattices of semilattices. The question whether the structure of partially ordered set would cause similar problems is answered by the following result.

Theorem (Wehrung 2008). For any distributive (∨,0)-semilattice S, there are a (∧,0)-semilattice P and a map μ : P × P → S such that the following conditions hold:

(1) x ≤ y implies that μ(x,y)=0, for all x, y in P.

(2) μ(x,z) ≤ μ(x,y) ∨ μ(y,z), for all x, y, z in P.

(3) For all x ≥ y in P and all α, β in S such that μ(x,y) ≤ α ∨ β, there are a positive integer n and elements x=z_{0} ≥ z_{1} ≥ ... ≥ z_{2n}=y such that μ(z_{i},z_{i+1}) ≤ α (resp., μ(z_{i},z_{i+1}) ≤ β) whenever i < 2n is even (resp., odd).

(4) S is generated, as a join-semilattice, by all the elements of the form μ(x,0), for x in P.

Furthermore, if S has a largest element, then P can be assumed to be a lattice with a largest element.

It is not hard to verify that conditions (1)–(4) above imply the distributivity of S, so the result above gives a characterization of distributivity for (∨,0)-semilattices.
