= Kernel (set theory) =

Equivalence relation expressing that two elements have the same image under a function

In set theory, the kernel of a function $f$ (or equivalence kernel) may be taken to be either

- the equivalence relation on the function's domain that roughly expresses the idea of "equivalent as far as the function $f$ can tell", or
- the corresponding partition of the domain.

An unrelated notion is that of the kernel of a non-empty family of sets $\mathcal{B},$ which by definition is the intersection of all its elements:
$$\ker \mathcal{B} ~=~ \bigcap_{B \in \mathcal{B}} \, B.$$
This definition is used in the theory of filters to classify them as being free or principal.

== Definition ==
Kernel of a function

For the formal definition, let $f : X \to Y$ be a function between two sets. Elements $x_1, x_2 \in X$ are equivalent if and only if $f\left(x_1\right)$ and $f\left(x_2\right)$ are equal, that is, are the same element of $Y.$ The kernel of $f$ is the equivalence relation thus defined.

Kernel of a family of sets

The kernel of a family $\mathcal{B} \neq \varnothing$ of sets is
$$\ker \mathcal{B} ~:=~ \bigcap_{B \in \mathcal{B}} B.$$
The kernel of $\mathcal{B}$ is also sometimes denoted by $\cap \mathcal{B}.$ The kernel of the empty set, $\ker \varnothing,$ is typically left undefined. A family is called fixed and is said to have non-empty intersection if its kernel is not empty. A family is said to be free if it is not fixed; that is, if its kernel is the empty set.

== Quotients ==
Like any equivalence relation, the kernel can be modded out to form a quotient set, and the quotient set is the partition:
$$\left\{\, \{w \in X : f(x) = f(w)\} ~:~ x \in X \,\right\} ~=~ \left\{f^{-1}(y) ~:~ y \in f(X)\right\}.$$

This quotient set $X /=_f$ is called the coimage of the function $f,$ and denoted $\operatorname{coim} f$ (or a variation). The coimage is naturally isomorphic (in the set-theoretic sense of a bijection) to the image, $\operatorname{im} f;$ specifically, the equivalence class of $x$ in $X$ (which is an element of $\operatorname{coim} f$) corresponds to $f(x)$ in $Y$ (which is an element of $\operatorname{im} f$).

== As a subset of the Cartesian product ==
Like any binary relation, the kernel of a function may be thought of as a subset of the Cartesian product $X \times X.$ In this guise, the kernel may be denoted $\ker f$ (or a variation) and may be defined symbolically as
$$\ker f := \{(x,x') : f(x) = f(x')\}.$$

The study of the properties of this subset can shed light on $f.$

== Algebraic structures ==
If $X$ and $Y$ are algebraic structures of some fixed type (such as groups, rings, or vector spaces), and if the function $f : X \to Y$ is a homomorphism, then $\ker f$ is a congruence relation (that is an equivalence relation that is compatible with the algebraic structure), and the coimage of $f$ is a quotient of $X.$ The bijection between the coimage and the image of $f$ is an isomorphism in the algebraic sense; this is the most general form of the first isomorphism theorem.

== In topology ==
If $f : X \to Y$ is a continuous function between two topological spaces then the topological properties of $\ker f$ can shed light on the spaces $X$ and $Y.$ For example, if $Y$ is a Hausdorff space then $\ker f$ must be a closed set. Conversely, if $X$ is a Hausdorff space and $\ker f$ is a closed set, then the coimage of $f,$ if given the quotient space topology, must also be a Hausdorff space.

A space is compact if and only if the kernel of every family of closed subsets having the finite intersection property (FIP) is non-empty; said differently, a space is compact if and only if every family of closed subsets with F.I.P. is fixed.

== See also ==
- Filter on a set – Family of subsets representing "large" sets

== Bibliography ==
- Awodey, Steve (2010) [2006]. Category Theory. Oxford Logic Guides. Vol. 49 (2nd ed.). Oxford University Press. ISBN 978-0-19-923718-0.
- Dolecki, Szymon; Mynard, Frédéric (2016). Convergence Foundations Of Topology. New Jersey: World Scientific Publishing Company. ISBN 978-981-4571-52-4. OCLC 945169917.
