= Finite lattice representation problem =

In mathematics, the finite lattice representation problem, or finite congruence lattice problem, asks whether every finite lattice is isomorphic to the congruence lattice of some finite algebra.

== Background ==
A lattice is called algebraic if it is complete and compactly generated. In 1963, Grätzer and Schmidt proved that every algebraic lattice is isomorphic to the congruence lattice of some algebra. Thus there is essentially no restriction on the shape of a congruence lattice of an algebra. The finite lattice representation problem asks whether the same is true for finite lattices and finite algebras. That is, does every finite lattice occur as the congruence lattice of a finite algebra?

In 1980, Pálfy and Pudlák proved that this problem is equivalent to the problem of deciding whether every finite lattice occurs as an interval in the subgroup lattice of a finite group. For an overview of the group theoretic approach to the problem, see Pálfy (1993) and Pálfy (2001).

This problem should not be confused with the congruence lattice problem.

== Significance ==
This is among the oldest unsolved problems in universal algebra. Until it is answered, the theory of finite algebras is incomplete since, given a finite algebra, it is unknown whether there are, a priori, any restrictions on the shape of its congruence lattice.
