= Quotient algebra =

Quotient algebra may refer to:

- Specifically, quotient associative algebra in ring theory
- or quotient Lie algebra
- Quotient (universal algebra) in the most general mathematical setting
