= Anna Richardson (disambiguation) =

Anna Richardson may refer to:

- Anna Richardson (abolitionist) (1806–1892), English Quaker slavery abolitionist and peace campaigner, writer and editor
- Anna Mann Richardson (1877–1953), American physician, health researcher
- Anna Ryder Richardson (born 1964), British interior designer and television presenter
- Anna Richardson (born 1970), English presenter, television producer, writer and journalist
- Anna Richardson (politician), Sint Maarten politician
- Anna Euretta Richardson (1883 – 1931), home economist and educator
