= Funayama =

Funayama (written: 船山 or 舟山) is a Japanese surname. Notable people with the surname include:

- Naoko Funayama (船山 直子), Japanese-American sportscaster
- Nenosuke Funayama (船山子之助), Japanese mathematician
- Takayuki Funayama (船山 貴之; born 1987), Japanese footballer
- Yasue Funayama (舟山 康江; born 1966), Japanese politician
- Yuji Funayama (disambiguation), multiple people
- Yumie Funayama (船山 弓枝; born 1978), Japanese curler

== See also ==
- Eta Funayama Sword, a National Treasure of Japan
