= Quotient ring =

Reduction of a ring by one of its ideals

In ring theory, a branch of abstract algebra, a quotient ring, also known as factor ring, difference ring or residue class ring, is a construction quite similar to the quotient group in group theory and to the quotient space in linear algebra. It is a specific example of a quotient, as viewed from the general setting of universal algebra. Starting with a ring $R$ and a two-sided ideal $I$ in $R$, a new ring, the quotient ring $R\ /\ I$, is constructed, whose elements are the cosets of $I$ in $R$ subject to $+$ and $\cdot$ operations compatible with $+$ and $\cdot$ in $R$. Quotient rings are denoted as a fraction, usually using the fraction slash "$/$" as the separator. The alternative of stacking the ring over the ideal using a horizontal line (i.e., the fraction bar) as a separator is sometimes used if the expressions for the ring or the ideal are long or cumbersome.

Quotient rings are distinct from the "quotient field", or field of fractions, of an integral domain as well as from the more general "rings of quotients" obtained by localization.

== Formal quotient ring construction ==
Given a ring $R$ and a two-sided ideal $I$ in $R$, we may define an equivalence relation $\sim$ on $R$ as follows:

$a \sim b$ if and only if $a - b$ is in $I$.

Using the ideal properties, it is not difficult to check that $\sim$ is a congruence relation. In case $a \sim b$, we say that $a$ and $b$ are congruent modulo $I.$ For example, in $\mathbb{Z},$ $16$ and $10$ are congruent modulo $(3)$, as their difference $6$ is an element of the ideal $(3)=3\mathbb{Z}.$

There are several different notations for the equivalence class of the element $a$ in $R$:
$$\left[ a \right] = \overline{a}  = a\  \operatorname{mod}\ I
= a + I := \left\lbrace a + r : r \in I \right\rbrace$$
The notation employing the infix "mod" is a generalization of the notation for residue classes in modular arithmetic and leads to the terminology "residue class of $a$ modulo $I$" for this equivalence class.

The set of all such equivalence classes is denoted by $R\ /\ I$; it becomes a ring, the factor ring or quotient ring of $R$ modulo $I$, if one defines

- $(a + I) + (b + I) = (a + b) + I$;
- $(a + I)(b + I) = (ab) + I$.

(Here one has to check that these definitions are well-defined. Compare coset and quotient group.) The zero-element of $R\ /\ I$ is $\bar{0} = 0 + I = I$, and the multiplicative identity is $\bar{1} = 1 + I$.

The map $p$ from $R$ to $R\ /\ I$ defined by $p(a) = a + I$ is a surjective ring homomorphism, sometimes called the natural quotient map, natural projection map, or the canonical homomorphism.

== Examples ==
- The quotient ring $R\ /\ \lbrace 0 \rbrace$ is naturally isomorphic to $R$, and $R / R$ is the zero ring $\lbrace 0 \rbrace$, since, by our definition, for any $r \in R$, we have that $\left[ r \right] = r + R = \left\lbrace r + b : b \in R \right\rbrace$, which equals $R$ itself. This fits with the rule of thumb that the larger the ideal $I$, the smaller the quotient ring $R\ /\ I$. If $I$ is a proper ideal of $R$, i.e., $I \neq R$, then $R / I$ is not the zero ring.
- Consider the ring of integers $\mathbb{Z}$ and the ideal of even numbers, denoted by $2 \mathbb{Z}$. Then the quotient ring $\mathbb{Z} / 2 \mathbb{Z}$ has only two elements, the coset $0 + 2 \mathbb{Z}$ consisting of the even numbers and the coset $1 + 2 \mathbb{Z}$ consisting of the odd numbers; applying the definition, $\left[ z \right] = z + 2 \mathbb{Z} = \left\lbrace z + 2y : 2y \in 2\mathbb{Z} \right\rbrace$, where $2 \mathbb{Z}$ is the ideal of even numbers. It is naturally isomorphic to the finite field with two elements, $F_{2}$. Intuitively: if you think of all the even numbers as $0$, then every integer is either $0$ (if it is even) or $1$ (if it is odd and therefore differs from an even number by $1$). Modular arithmetic is essentially arithmetic in the quotient ring $\mathbb{Z} / n \mathbb{Z}$ (which has $n$ elements).
- Now consider the ring of polynomials in the variable $X$ with real coefficients, $\mathbb{R} [X]$, and the ideal $I = \left( X^2 + 1 \right)$ consisting of all multiples of the polynomial $X^2 + 1$. The quotient ring $\mathbb{R} [X]\ /\ ( X^2 + 1 )$ is naturally isomorphic to the field of complex numbers $\mathbb{C}$, with the class $[X]$ playing the role of the imaginary unit $i$. The reason is that we "forced" $X^2 + 1 = 0$, i.e. $X^2 = -1$, which is the defining property of $i$. Since any integer exponent of $i$ must be either $\pm i$ or $\pm 1$, that means all possible polynomials essentially simplify to the form $a + bi$. (To clarify, the quotient ring $\mathbb{R} [X]\ /\ ( X^2 + 1 )$ is actually naturally isomorphic to the field of all linear polynomials $aX + b; a,b \in \mathbb{R}$, where the operations are performed modulo $X^2 + 1$. In return, we have $X^2 = -1$, and this is matching $X$ to the imaginary unit in the isomorphic field of complex numbers.)
- Generalizing the previous example, quotient rings are often used to construct field extensions. Suppose $K$ is some field and $f$ is an irreducible polynomial in $K[X]$. Then $L = K[X]\ /\ (f)$ is a field whose minimal polynomial over $K$ is $f$, which contains $K$ as well as an element $x = X + (f)$.
- One important instance of the previous example is the construction of the finite fields. Consider for instance the field $F_3 = \mathbb{Z} / 3\mathbb{Z}$ with three elements. The polynomial $f(X) = X^2 +1$ is irreducible over $F_3$ (since it has no root), and we can construct the quotient ring $F_3 [X]\ /\ (f)$. This is a field with $3^2 = 9$ elements, denoted by $F_9$. The other finite fields can be constructed in a similar fashion.
- The coordinate rings of algebraic varieties are important examples of quotient rings in algebraic geometry. As a simple case, consider the real variety $V = \left\lbrace (x,y) | x^2 = y^3 \right\rbrace$ as a subset of the real plane $\mathbb{R}^2$. The ring of real-valued polynomial functions defined on $V$ can be identified with the quotient ring $\mathbb{R} [X,Y]\ /\ (X^2 - Y^3)$, and this is the coordinate ring of $V$. The variety $V$ is now investigated by studying its coordinate ring.
- Suppose $M$ is a $\mathbb{C}^{\infty}$-manifold, and $p$ is a point of $M$. Consider the ring $R = \mathbb{C}^{\infty}(M)$ of all $\mathbb{C}^{\infty}$-functions defined on $M$ and let $I$ be the ideal in $R$ consisting of those functions $f$ which are identically zero in some neighborhood $U$ of $p$ (where $U$ may depend on $f$). Then the quotient ring $R\ /\ I$ is the ring of germs of $\mathbb{C}^{\infty}$-functions on $M$ at $p$.
- Consider the ring $F$ of finite elements of a hyperreal field $^* \mathbb{R}$. It consists of all hyperreal numbers differing from a standard real by an infinitesimal amount, or equivalently: of all hyperreal numbers $x$ for which a standard integer $n$ with $-n < x < n$ exists. The set $I$ of all infinitesimal numbers in $^* \mathbb{R}$, together with $0$, is an ideal in $F$, and the quotient ring $F\ /\ I$ is isomorphic to the real numbers $\mathbb{R}$. The isomorphism is induced by associating to every element $x$ of $F$ the standard part of $x$, i.e. the unique real number that differs from $x$ by an infinitesimal. In fact, one obtains the same result, namely $\mathbb{R}$, if one starts with the ring $F$ of finite hyperrationals (i.e. ratio of a pair of hyperintegers), see construction of the real numbers.

=== Real quadratic algebras ===
The quotients $\mathbb{R} [X] / (X)$, $\mathbb{R} [X] / (X + 1)$, and $\mathbb{R} [X] / (X - 1)$ are all isomorphic to $\mathbb{R}$ and gain little interest at first. But note that $\mathbb{R} [X] / (X^2)$ is called the dual number plane in geometric algebra. It consists only of linear binomials as "remainders" after reducing an element of $\mathbb{R} [X]$ by $X^2$. This quadratic algebra arises as a subalgebra whenever the algebra contains a real line and a nilpotent.

Furthermore, the ring quotient $\mathbb{R} [X] / (X^2 - 1)$ does split into $\mathbb{R} [X] / (X + 1)$ and $\mathbb{R} [X] / (X - 1)$, so this algebra is often viewed as the direct sum $\mathbb{R} \oplus \mathbb{R}$. Nevertheless, a quadratic algebra $z = x + yj$ is defined by $j$ as an element of the ideal of $(X^2 - 1)$, compared to $i$ as root of $X^2 + 1 = 0$. This plane of split-complex numbers normalizes the direct sum $\mathbb{R} \oplus \mathbb{R}$ by providing a basis $\left\lbrace 1, j \right\rbrace$ for 2-space where the identity of the algebra is at unit distance from the zero. With this basis a unit hyperbola may be compared to the unit circle of the ordinary complex plane. The unit hyperbola finds applications where the circle must be replaced with the hyperbola for purposes of analytic geometry.

=== Quaternions and variations ===
Suppose $X$ and $Y$ are two non-commuting indeterminates and form the free algebra $\mathbb{R} \langle X, Y \rangle$. Then Hamilton's quaternions of 1843 can be cast as:
$$\mathbb{R} \langle X, Y \rangle / ( X^2 + 1,\, Y^2 + 1,\, XY + YX )$$

If $Y^2 - 1$ is substituted for $Y^2 + 1$, then one obtains the ring of split-quaternions. The anti-commutative property $YX = -XY$ implies that $XY$ has as its square:
$$(XY) (XY) = X (YX) Y = -X (XY) Y = -(XX) (YY) = -(-1)(+1) = +1$$

Substituting minus for plus in both the quadratic binomials also results in split-quaternions.

The three types of biquaternions can also be written as quotients by use of the free algebra with three indeterminates $\mathbb{R} \langle X, Y, Z \rangle$ and constructing appropriate ideals.

== Properties ==
Clearly, if $R$ is a commutative ring, then so is $R\ /\ I$; the converse, however, is not necessarily true.

The natural quotient map $p$ has $I$ as its kernel; since the kernel of every ring homomorphism is a two-sided ideal, we can state that two-sided ideals are precisely the kernels of ring homomorphisms.

The intimate relationship between ring homomorphisms, kernels and quotient rings can be summarized as follows: the ring homomorphisms defined on $R\ /\ I$ are essentially the same as the ring homomorphisms defined on $R$ that vanish (i.e. are zero) on $I$. More precisely, given a two-sided ideal $I$ in $R$ and a ring homomorphism $f : R \to S$ whose kernel contains $I$, there exists precisely one ring homomorphism $g : R\ /\ I \to S$ with $gp = f$ (where $p$ is the natural quotient map). The map $g$ here is given by the well-defined rule $g([a]) = f(a)$ for all $a$ in $1 R$. Indeed, this universal property can be used to define quotient rings and their natural quotient maps.

As a consequence of the above, one obtains the fundamental statement: every ring homomorphism $f : R \to S$ induces a ring isomorphism between the quotient ring $R\ /\ \ker (f)$ and the image $\mathrm{im} (f)$. (See also: Fundamental theorem on homomorphisms.)

The ideals of $R$ and $R\ /\ I$ are closely related: the natural quotient map provides a bijection between the two-sided ideals of $R$ that contain $I$ and the two-sided ideals of $R\ /\ I$ (the same is true for left and for right ideals). This relationship between two-sided ideal extends to a relationship between the corresponding quotient rings: if $M$ is a two-sided ideal in $R$ that contains $I$, and we write $M\ /\ I$ for the corresponding ideal in $R\ /\ I$ (i.e. $M\ /\ I = p(M)$), the quotient rings $R\ /\ M$ and $(R / I)\ /\ (M / I)$ are naturally isomorphic via the (well-defined) mapping $a + M \mapsto (a + I) + M / I$.

The following facts prove useful in commutative algebra and algebraic geometry: for $R \neq \lbrace 0 \rbrace$ commutative, $R\ /\ I$ is a field if and only if $I$ is a maximal ideal, while $R / I$ is an integral domain if and only if $I$ is a prime ideal. A number of similar statements relate properties of the ideal $I$ to properties of the quotient ring $R\ /\ I$.

The Chinese remainder theorem states that, if the ideal $I$ is the intersection (or equivalently, the product) of pairwise coprime ideals $I_1, \ldots, I_k$, then the quotient ring $R\ /\ I$ is isomorphic to the product of the quotient rings $R\ /\ I_n,\; n = 1, \ldots, k$.

== For algebras over a ring ==
An associative algebra $A$ over a commutative ring $R$ is itself a ring. If $I$ is an ideal in $A$ (closed under $A$-multiplication: $AI \subseteq I$), then $A / I$ inherits the structure of an algebra over $R$ and is the quotient algebra.

== See also ==
- Associated graded ring
- Residue field
- Goldie's theorem
- Quotient module

== Further references ==
- F. Kasch (1978) Moduln und Ringe, translated by DAR Wallace (1982) Modules and Rings, Academic Press, page 33.
- Neal H. McCoy (1948) Rings and Ideals, §13 Residue class rings, page 61, Carus Mathematical Monographs #8, Mathematical Association of America.
- Joseph Rotman (1998). Galois Theory (2nd ed.). Springer. pp. 21–23. ISBN 0-387-98541-7.
- B.L. van der Waerden (1970) Algebra, translated by Fred Blum and John R Schulenberger, Frederick Ungar Publishing, New York. See Chapter 3.5, "Ideals. Residue Class Rings", pp. 47–51.
