= Quotient module =

Algebraic construction

In algebra, given a module and a submodule, one can construct their quotient module. This construction, described below, is very similar to that of a quotient vector space. It differs from analogous quotient constructions of rings and groups by the fact that in the latter cases, the subspace that is used for defining the quotient is not of the same nature as the ambient space (that is, a quotient ring is the quotient of a ring by an ideal, not a subring, and a quotient group is the quotient of a group by a normal subgroup, not by a general subgroup).

Given a module A over a ring R, and a submodule B of A, the quotient space A/B is defined by the equivalence relation

$a \sim b$ if and only if $b - a \in B,$

for any a, b in A. The elements of A/B are the equivalence classes $[a] = a+B = \{a+b:b \in B\}.$ The function $\pi: A \to A/B$ sending a in A to its equivalence class a + B is called the quotient map or the projection map, and is a module homomorphism.

The addition operation on A/B is defined for two equivalence classes as the equivalence class of the sum of two representatives from these classes; and scalar multiplication of elements of A/B by elements of R is defined similarly. Note that it has to be shown that these operations are well-defined. Then A/B becomes itself an R-module, called the quotient module. In symbols, for all a, b in A and r in R:

$$\begin{align}
& (a+B)+(b+B) := (a+b)+B, \\
& r \cdot (a+B) := (r \cdot a)+B.
\end{align}$$

== Examples ==
Consider the polynomial ring, $\R[X]$ with real coefficients, and the $\R[X]$-module $A=\R[X],$ . Consider the submodule

$$B = (X^2+1) \R[X]$$

of A, that is, the submodule of all polynomials divisible by X^{2} + 1. It follows that the equivalence relation determined by this module will be

P(X) ~ Q(X) if and only if P(X) and Q(X) give the same remainder when divided by X^{2} + 1.

Therefore, in the quotient module A/B, X^{2} + 1 is the same as 0; so one can view A/B as obtained from $\R[X]$ by setting X^{2} + 1 = 0. This quotient module is isomorphic to the complex numbers, viewed as a module over the real numbers $\R.$

== See also ==
- Quotient group
- Quotient ring
- Quotient (universal algebra)
