= Canonical map =

Mathematical mapping between objects arising from their definitions

In mathematics, a canonical map, also called a natural map, is a map or morphism between objects that arises naturally from the definition or the construction of the objects. Often, it is a map which preserves the widest amount of structure. A choice of a canonical map sometimes depends on a convention (e.g., a sign convention).

A closely related notion is that of a structure map or structure morphism: the map or morphism that comes with the given structure on the object. These are also sometimes called canonical maps.

A canonical isomorphism is a canonical map that is also an isomorphism (that is, invertible). In some contexts, it might be necessary to address an issue of choices of canonical maps or canonical isomorphisms; for a typical example, see prestack.

== Examples ==
- If N is a normal subgroup of a group G, then there is a canonical surjective group homomorphism from G to the quotient group G / N, that sends an element g to the coset determined by g.
- If I is an ideal of a ring R, then there is a canonical surjective ring homomorphism from R onto the quotient ring R / I that sends an element r to its coset I + r.
- If S is a multiplicative set in commutative ring R, then there is a canonical ring homomorphism from R to the localization S^{−1}R that sends element r to r/1 in the localization.
- If R_{f} is the localization of commutative ring R by S = {1, f, f^{2}, f^{3}, ...}, and R_{p} is the localization of R by S = R \ p, where p is a prime ideal such that f ∉ p, there is a canonical ring homomorphism α : R_{f} → R_{p} mapping a/f^{n} as an element of R_{f} to a/f^{n} as an element of R_{p}. If φ is the canonical map R → R_{p} and ψ is the canonical map R → R_{f}, then α is the unique map such that φ = α ∘ ψ.
- If V is a finite-dimenstional vector space, then there is a canonical map from V to the second dual space of V, that sends a vector v to the linear functional f_{v} defined by f_{v}(λ) = λ(v).
- If f: R → S is a homomorphism between commutative rings, then S can be viewed as an algebra over R. The ring homomorphism f is then called the structure map (for the algebra structure). The corresponding map on the prime spectra f^{*}: Spec(S) → Spec(R) is also called the structure map. More generally, a scheme X over a scheme S is one equipped with a structure morphism X → S; for a scheme over a field k (e.g., a variety), this is a morphism X → Spec(k).
- If E is a vector bundle over a topological space X, then the projection map from E to X is the structure map.
- In topology, a canonical map is a function f mapping a set X → X / R (X mod R), where R is an equivalence relation on X, that takes each x in X to the equivalence class [x] mod R.

== See also ==
- Natural transformation
