= Maximal semilattice quotient =

In abstract algebra, a branch of mathematics, a maximal semilattice quotient is a commutative monoid derived from another commutative monoid by making certain elements equivalent to each other.

Every commutative monoid can be endowed with its algebraic preordering ≤ . By definition, x≤ y holds, if there exists z such that x+z=y. Further, for x, y in M, let $x\propto y$ hold, if there exists a positive integer n such that x≤ ny, and let $x\asymp y$ hold, if $x\propto y$ and $y\propto x$. The binary relation $\asymp$ is a monoid congruence of M, and the quotient monoid $M/{\asymp}$ is the maximal semilattice quotient of M.

This terminology can be explained by the fact that the canonical projection p from M onto $M/{\asymp}$ is universal among all monoid homomorphisms from M to a (∨,0)-semilattice, that is, for any (∨,0)-semilattice S and any monoid homomorphism f: M→ S, there exists a unique (∨,0)-homomorphism $g\colon M/{\asymp}\to S$ such that f=gp.

If M is a refinement monoid, then $M/{\asymp}$ is a distributive semilattice.
