= Distributive homomorphism =

A congruence θ of a join-semilattice S is monomial, if the θ-equivalence class of any element of S has a largest element. We say that θ is distributive, if it is a join, in the congruence lattice Con S of S, of monomial join-congruences of S.

The following definition originates in Schmidt's 1968 work and was subsequently adjusted by Wehrung.

Definition (weakly distributive homomorphisms). A homomorphism μ : S → T between join-semilattices S and T is weakly distributive, if for all a, b in S and all c in T such that μ(c) ≤ a ∨ b, there are elements x and y of S such that c ≤ x ∨ y, μ(x) ≤ a, and μ(y) ≤ b.

Examples:

(1) For an algebra B and a reduct A of B (that is, an algebra with same underlying set as B but whose set of operations is a subset of the one of B), the canonical (∨, 0)-homomorphism from Con_{c} A to Con_{c} B is weakly distributive. Here, Con_{c} A denotes the (∨, 0)-semilattice of all compact congruences of A.

(2) For a convex sublattice K of a lattice L, the canonical (∨, 0)-homomorphism from Con_{c} K to Con_{c} L is weakly distributive.
