= Holbrook Mann MacNeille =

American mathematician

Holbrook Mann MacNeille (May 11, 1907 – September 30, 1973) was an American mathematician who worked for the United States Atomic Energy Commission before becoming the first Executive Director of the American Mathematical Society.

== Personal life ==
MacNeille was born May 11, 1907, in New York City and was raised in Summit, New Jersey, the first of two brothers. His father was Perry Robinson MacNeille, an architect and urban planner and his mother Clausine Mann MacNeille who was active on the Summit Board of Education. His aunts were the Jungian analysts Kristine Mann and Anna Mann Richardson.

MacNeille went to the Summit Public Schools and summered in Bailey Island, Maine. At Bailey Island he became acquainted with Frank Aydelotte who encouraged him to go to Swarthmore College from which he graduated with highest honors in 1928. Following in Aydelotte's footsteps he was a Rhodes Scholar at Balliol College, Oxford, England 1928–1930 receiving a B.A. in 1930 and an M.A. in 1947. He received a Ph.D. in Mathematics from Harvard University in 1935 where he was the first student of Marshall Harvey Stone, was a Sterling Fellow at Yale University from 1935–1936 and a Benjamin Peirce Instructor at Harvard between 1936–1938. During the summers he was also a partner in the Dave Richardson Laboratories in Bailey Island, Maine, which produced dogfish prepared for dissection at school laboratories.

MacNeille's Ph.D work resulted in the MacNeille completion theorem, a generalization of the construction of real numbers from the ordered set of rationals by Dedekind cuts.

Upon completing his studies, he taught mathematics at Kenyon College as an associate professor (1938–1941), full professor (1941–1947) and chairman of the department (1945–1947).

== World War II ==
During several of the years at Kenyon College he was on leave as Scientific Liaison Officer (1944–1945) and Head of Mission (1945–1946) London Mission of the Office of Scientific Research and Development, American Embassy in London, England. During (1946–1948) he was Scientific Director of the London Branch Office of the U.S. Office of Naval Research and then during (1948–1949) spent more than a year as chief of the fundamental research branch of the Atomic Energy Commission in Washington, D.C. In 1948 he received the President's Certificate of Merit from President Harry S. Truman.

== After World War II ==
In November 1949 he became executive director of the American Mathematical Society where he served until 1954. From 1954–1961 he was professor and chairman of the Department of Mathematics in the College of Arts and Sciences at Washington University in St. Louis, and then from 1961 professor and chairman of the Department of Mathematics at Case Western Reserve University in Cleveland, Ohio, until his death.

During this latter period he became interested in teaching, and directed several educational movies as part of the Calculus Film Project of the Educational Media Committee of the Mathematical Association of America.

He was killed accidentally when hit by a car while riding his bicycle.

== Filmography ==
- "Area under a curve"
- "The definite integral"
- "Volume of a solid of revolution"
- "Infinite acres"
- "Volume of a solid of a revolution"
- "Volume by shells"
- "Theorem of the Mean Policeman"

== Awards and other positions ==
- Rhodes Scholarship (1928) (Swarthmore College, Balliol)
- John William Sterling Research Fellowship, Yale University (1936–1936)
- Benjamin Peirce Instructor in Mathematics, Harvard University (1936–1938)
- President's Certificate of Merit, President Harry S. Truman (1948)
- Society for Industrial and Applied Mathematics council (1961–1964)
- Fellow of the American Association for the Advancement of Science council (1964)
- Chairman of the Mathematics Association of America committee on Educational Media (1962–1963)
- Phi Beta Kappa
- Associate editor Sigma Xi Mathematics Magazine (1962–1963)

== Publications ==
- 1936: "Extensions of Partially Ordered Sets", Proceedings of the National Academy of Sciences, Vol. 22(1): 45–50
- 1937: Partially Ordered Sets, Transactions of the American Mathematical Society, Vol. 42(3): 416–460
- 1938: "Extensions of Measure", Proceedings of the National Academy of Sciences, Vol. 24, No. 4 (Apr. 15, 1938), pp. 188–193
- 1939: "Lattices and Boolean Rings", Bulletin of the American Mathematical Society
- 1939: Extension of a distributive lattice to a Boolean ring, Bulletin of the American Mathematical Society
- 1941: A Unified Theory of Integration, Proceedings of the National Academy of Sciences, Vol. 27
