= Kuratowski's free set theorem =

Kuratowski's free set theorem, named after Kazimierz Kuratowski, is a result of set theory, an area of mathematics. It was largely forgotten for decades, but has been applied recently in solving several lattice theory problems, such as the congruence lattice problem.

Denote by $[X]^{<\omega}$ the set of all finite subsets of a set $X$. Likewise, for a positive integer $n$, denote by $[X]^n$ the set of all $n$-elements subsets of $X$. For a mapping $\Phi\colon[X]^n\to[X]^{<\omega}$, we say that a subset $U$ of $X$ is free (with respect to $\Phi$), if for any $n$-element subset $V$ of $U$ and any $u\in U\setminus V$, $u\notin\Phi(V)$. Kuratowski published in 1951 the following result, which characterizes the infinite cardinals of the form $\aleph_n$.

The theorem states the following. Let $n$ be a positive integer and let $X$ be a set. Then the cardinality of $X$ is greater than or equal to $\aleph_n$ if and only if for every mapping $\Phi$ from $[X]^n$ to $[X]^{<\omega}$, there exists an $(n+1)$-element free subset of $X$ with respect to $\Phi$.

For $n=1$, Kuratowski's free set theorem is superseded by Hajnal's set mapping theorem.
