= Congruence-permutable algebra =

In universal algebra, a congruence-permutable algebra is an algebra whose congruences commute under composition. This symmetry has several equivalent characterizations, which lend to the analysis of such algebras. Many familiar varieties of algebras, such as the variety of groups, consist of congruence-permutable algebras, but some, like the variety of lattices, have members that are not congruence-permutable.

== Definition ==
Given an algebra $\mathbf{A}$, a pair of congruences $\alpha,\beta\in\operatorname{Con}(\mathbf{A})$ are said to permute when $\alpha\circ\beta=\beta\circ\alpha$. An algebra $\mathbf{A}$ is called congruence-permutable when each pair of congruences of $\mathbf{A}$ permute. A variety of algebras $\mathcal{V}$ is referred to as congruence-permutable when every algebra in $\mathcal{V}$ is congruence-permutable.

== Properties ==
In 1954 Maltsev gave two other conditions that are equivalent to the one given above defining a congruence-permutable variety of algebras. This initiated the study of congruence-permutable varieties.

=== Theorem (Maltsev, 1954) ===
Suppose that $\mathcal{V}$ is a variety of algebras. The following are equivalent:

1. The variety $\mathcal{V}$ is congruence-permutable.
2. The free algebra on $3$ generators in $\mathcal{V}$ is congruence-permutable.
3. There is a ternary term $q$ such that
  $$\mathcal{V}\models q(x,y,y)\approx x\approx q(y,y,x)$$.

Such a term is called a Maltsev term and congruence-permutable varieties are also known as Maltsev varieties in his honor.

== Examples ==
Most classical varieties in abstract algebra, such as groups, rings, and Lie algebras are congruence-permutable. Any variety that contains a group operation is congruence-permutable, and the Maltsev term is $xy^{-1}z$.

== Nonexamples ==
Viewed as a lattice the chain with three elements is not congruence-permutable and hence neither is the variety of lattices.
