= Anna Mann Richardson =

American psychoanalyst

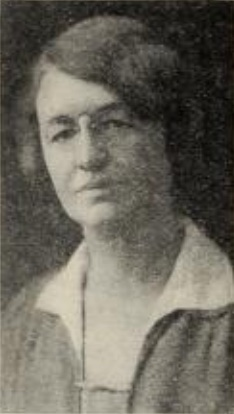
- Anna Mann Richardson, from a 1927 publication
- Born: Anna Root Mann; April 6, 1877; Orange, New Jersey, U.S.
- Died: September 10, 1953 (age 76); Rochester, New York, U.S.
- Occupations: Psychoanalyst, physician
- Relatives: Harriet Mann Miller (aunt); Kristine Mann (sister); Holbrook Mann MacNeille (nephew)

Anna Root Mann Richardson (April 6, 1877 – September 10, 1953) was an American psychoanalyst, physician, and health policy researcher.

== Early life and education ==
Anna Mann was born in Orange, New Jersey, the daughter of Charles Holbrook Mann and Clausine Kristine Riborg Borchsenius Mann. Her mother was born in Denmark. Her father was a Swedenborgian minister and theologian. Her aunt, Harriet Mann Miller, was a noted ornithologist and writer.

Mann earned her medical degree from Boston University in 1901. She trained as a psychoanalyst in Switzerland with Carl Jung, as did her older sister, Kristine Mann. Another sister, Clausine Mann MacNeille, was dean of women at Swarthmore College. Her brothers were Horace B. Mann, a prominent architect, and Charles Riborg Mann, a physicist and government adviser. Mathematician Holbrook Mann MacNeille was her nephew.

== Career ==
Mann practiced medicine during summers on Bailey Island, Maine. In the 1920s, she was a health policy researcher associated with the Russell Sage Foundation from 1912 to 1916, and with the United Hospital Fund of New York in the 1920s. She was campus physician at Smith College from 1927 to 1940; in this role, she oversaw student health, including mental health and hygiene, and physical education courses.

== Publications ==
- "Scope and Cost of Health Examinations" (1923, with Michael Marks Davis)
- "Medical Responsibility for Country Care Examinations" (1924)
- "Physical Examinations of 91 Brooklyn Physicians" (1924)
- "How Often Should a Physician Examine His Clients?" (1925)
- "Typical Cases and End Results of Periodic Health Examinations" (1926)
- New Clinics for Old: A Study of Clinics Unattached to Hospitals in New York City (1927, with Michael Marks Davis)
- Health Services in Clinics (1927)
- "Health Service in Clinics and What it Includes" (1927)
- "The Place of the Unattached Clinic in Health Service" (1927)

== Personal life ==
Mann married engineer James Herbert Richardson. They had two sons, David and Charles. Her husband died in 1936, and she died in 1953, at the age of 76.
