= Anna Euretta Richardson =

American home economist and educator (1883-1931)

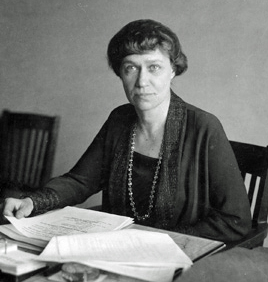
- Born: September 5, 1883; Charleston, South Carolina, U.S.
- Died: February 3, 1931 (aged 47)
- Occupation(s): Home Economist, Educator

Anna Euretta Richardson (1883 – 1931) was an American home economist and educator.

Richardson was born on September 5, 1883. Her parents were William and Euretta Richardson. She graduated with a Bachelor of Science degree from Peabody College for Teachers before going on to the University of Chicago, and Columbia University.

Her career includes establishing the home economic program at Agnes Scott College for Women, serving on the U.S. Federal Board for Vocational Education from 1917 to 1922, and serving as dean of the Home Economics division of Iowa State College from 1923 to 1926. She was particularly interested in the subject of child development. She wrote articles for The Iowa Homemaker.

In 1930, Richardson received an honorary doctorate from the University of Maryland (UMD) for leadership in the field of home economics. She was the first woman to receive an honorary doctorate from UMD

Richardson died on February 3, 1931.
