= Quotient space (linear algebra) =

Vector space consisting of affine subsets

In linear algebra, the quotient of a vector space $V$ by a subspace $U$ is a vector space obtained by "collapsing" $U$ to zero. The space obtained is called a quotient space and is denoted $V/U$ (read "$V$ mod $U$" or "$V$ by $U$"). Alternatively phrased, the quotient space $V/U$ is the set of all affine subsets of $V$ which are parallel to $U$. A quotient space $A/U$ can also be defined for an affine space $A$ by a linear space $U$.

== Definition ==
Formally, the construction is as follows. Let $V$ be a vector space over a field $\mathbb{K}$, and let $U$ be a subspace of $V$. We define an equivalence relation $\sim$ on $V$ by stating that $x \sim y$ iff $x - y \in U$. That is, $x$ is related to $y$ if and only if one can be obtained from the other by adding an element of $U$. This definition implies that any element of $U$ is related to the zero vector; more precisely, all the vectors in $U$ get mapped into the equivalence class of the zero vector.

The equivalence class – or, in this case, the coset – of $v$ is defined as

$$[v] := \{ w : v - w \in U \}$$.

Equivalently, $[v] = \{ v + u : u \in U \}$, so it is often denoted using the shorthand $v + U$.

The quotient space $V/U$ is then defined as $V/\mathord\sim$, the set of all equivalence classes induced by $\sim$ on $U$. Scalar multiplication and addition are defined on the equivalence classes by

- $\alpha [x] = [\alpha x]$ for all $\alpha \in \mathbb{K}$, and
- $[x] + [y] = [x+y]$.

It is not hard to check that these operations are well-defined (i.e. do not depend on the choice of representatives). These operations turn the quotient space $V/U$ into a vector space over $\mathbb{K}$ with $U$ being the zero class, $[0]$.

The mapping that associates to $v \in V$ the equivalence class $[v]$ is known as the quotient map.

== Examples ==
=== Lines in Cartesian Plane ===
Let X = R^{2} be the standard Cartesian plane, and let Y be a line through the origin in X. Then the quotient space X/Y can be identified with the space of all lines in X which are parallel to Y. That is to say that, the elements of the set X/Y are lines in X parallel to Y. Note that the points along any one such line will satisfy the equivalence relation because their difference vectors (relative positions) belong to Y. This gives a way to visualize quotient spaces geometrically. (By re-parameterising these lines, the quotient space can more conventionally be represented as the space of all points along a line through the origin that is not parallel to Y. Similarly, the quotient space for R^{3} by a line through the origin can again be represented as the set of all co-parallel lines, or alternatively be represented as the vector space consisting of a plane which only intersects the line at the origin.)

=== Subspaces of Cartesian Space ===
Another example is the quotient of R^{n} by the subspace spanned by the first m standard basis vectors. The space R^{n} consists of all n-tuples of real numbers (x_{1}, ..., x_{n}). The subspace, identified with R^{m}, consists of all n-tuples such that the last n − m entries are zero: (x_{1}, ..., x_{m}, 0, 0, ..., 0). Two vectors of R^{n} are in the same equivalence class modulo the subspace if and only if they are identical in the last n − m coordinates. The quotient space R^{n}/R^{m} is isomorphic to R^{n−m} in an obvious manner.

=== Polynomial Vector Space ===
Let $\mathcal{P}_3(\mathbb{R})$ be the vector space of all cubic polynomials over the real numbers. Then $\mathcal{P}_3(\mathbb{R}) / \langle x^2 \rangle$ is a quotient space, where each element is the set corresponding to polynomials that differ by a quadratic term only. For example, one element of the quotient space is $\{x^3 + a x^2 - 2x + 3 : a \in \mathbb{R}\}$, while another element of the quotient space is $\{a x^2 + 2.7 x : a \in \mathbb{R}\}$.

=== General Subspaces ===
More generally, if V is an (internal) direct sum of subspaces U and W,

$$V=U\oplus W$$

then the quotient space V/U is naturally isomorphic to W.

=== Lebesgue Integrals ===
An important example of a functional quotient space is an L^{p} space.

== Properties ==
There is a natural epimorphism from V to the quotient space V/U given by sending x to its equivalence class [x]. The kernel (or nullspace) of this epimorphism is the subspace U. This relationship is neatly summarized by the short exact sequence

$$0\to U\to V\to V/U\to 0.\,$$

If U is a subspace of V, the dimension of V/U is called the codimension of U in V. Since a basis of V may be constructed from a basis A of U and a basis B of V/U by adding a representative of each element of B to A, the dimension of V is the sum of the dimensions of U and V/U. If V is finite-dimensional, it follows that the codimension of U in V is the difference between the dimensions of V and U:

$$\mathrm{codim}(U) = \dim(V/U) = \dim(V) - \dim(U).$$

Let T : V → W be a linear operator. The kernel of T, denoted ker(T), is the set of all x in V such that Tx = 0. The kernel is a subspace of V. The first isomorphism theorem for vector spaces says that the quotient space V/ker(T) is isomorphic to the image of V in W. An immediate corollary, for finite-dimensional spaces, is the rank–nullity theorem: the dimension of V is equal to the dimension of the kernel (the nullity of T) plus the dimension of the image (the rank of T).

The cokernel of a linear operator T : V → W is defined to be the quotient space W/im(T).

== Isomorphism Theorems ==
=== First Isomorphism Theorem ===
Let $V,W$ be $\mathbb{K}$-Vector Spaces and $T: V \to W$ linear. Define the map $\overline T:V/\ker T \to \operatorname{im}(T)$ by $\overline T([v])=T(v).$ Then $\overline T$ is well-defined and an isomorphism.

== Quotient of a Banach space by a subspace ==
If X is a Banach space and M is a closed subspace of X, then the quotient X/M is again a Banach space. The quotient space is already endowed with a vector space structure by the construction of the previous section. We define a norm on X/M by

$$\| [x] \|_{X/M} = \inf_{m \in M} \|x-m\|_X = \inf_{m \in M} \|x+m\|_X = \inf_{y\in [x]}\|y\|_X.$$

=== Examples ===
Let C[0,1] denote the Banach space of continuous real-valued functions on the interval [0,1] with the sup norm. Denote the subspace of all functions f ∈ C[0,1] with f(0) = 0 by M. Then the equivalence class of some function g is determined by its value at 0, and the quotient space C[0,1]/M is isomorphic to R.

If X is a Hilbert space, then the quotient space X/M is isomorphic to the orthogonal complement of M.

=== Generalization to locally convex spaces ===
The quotient of a locally convex space by a closed subspace is again locally convex. Indeed, suppose that X is locally convex so that the topology on X is generated by a family of seminorms {p_{α} | α ∈ A} where A is an index set. Let M be a closed subspace, and define seminorms q_{α} on X/M by

$$q_\alpha([x]) = \inf_{v\in [x]} p_\alpha(v).$$

Then X/M is a locally convex space, and the topology on it is the quotient topology.

If, furthermore, X is metrizable, then so is X/M. If X is a Fréchet space, then so is X/M.

== See also ==
- Quotient group
- Quotient module
- Quotient set
- Quotient space (topology)

== Sources ==
- Axler, Sheldon (2015). Linear Algebra Done Right. Undergraduate Texts in Mathematics (3rd ed.). Springer. ISBN 978-3-319-11079-0.
- Dieudonné, Jean (1976), Treatise on Analysis, vol. 2, Academic Press, ISBN 978-0122155024
- Halmos, Paul Richard (1974) [1958]. Finite-Dimensional Vector Spaces. Undergraduate Texts in Mathematics (2nd ed.). Springer. ISBN 0-387-90093-4.
- Katznelson, Yitzhak; Katznelson, Yonatan R. (2008). A (Terse) Introduction to Linear Algebra. American Mathematical Society. ISBN 978-0-8218-4419-9.
- Roman, Steven (2005). Advanced Linear Algebra. Graduate Texts in Mathematics (2nd ed.). Springer. ISBN 0-387-24766-1.
