= Yuji Funayama =

Yuji Funayama may refer to:

- Yuji Funayama (basketball) (born 1992), Japanese basketball player
- Yuji Funayama (bobsleigh) (born 1953), Japanese bobsledder
- Yuji Funayama (footballer) (born 1985), Japanese footballer
