= Refinement monoid =

Concept in abstract algebra

In mathematics, a refinement monoid is a commutative monoid M such that for any elements a_{0}, a_{1}, b_{0}, b_{1} of M such that a_{0}+a_{1}=b_{0}+b_{1}, there are elements c_{00}, c_{01}, c_{10}, c_{11} of M such that a_{0}=c_{00}+c_{01}, a_{1}=c_{10}+c_{11}, b_{0}=c_{00}+c_{10}, and b_{1}=c_{01}+c_{11}.

A commutative monoid M is said to be conical if x+y=0 implies that x=y=0, for any elements x,y of M.

== Basic examples ==
A join-semilattice with zero is a refinement monoid if and only if it is distributive.

Any abelian group is a refinement monoid.

The positive cone G^{+} of a partially ordered abelian group G is a refinement monoid if and only if G is an interpolation group, the latter meaning that for any elements a_{0}, a_{1}, b_{0}, b_{1} of G such that a_{i} ≤ b_{j} for all i, j<2, there exists an element x of G such that a_{i} ≤ x ≤ b_{j} for all i, j<2. This holds, for example, in case G is lattice-ordered.

The isomorphism type of a Boolean algebra B is the class of all Boolean algebras isomorphic to B. (If we want this to be a set, restrict to Boolean algebras of set-theoretical rank below the one of B.) The class of isomorphism types of Boolean algebras, endowed with the addition defined by $[X]+[Y]=[X\times Y]$ (for any Boolean algebras X and Y, where $[X]$ denotes the isomorphism type of X), is a conical refinement monoid.

== Vaught measures on Boolean algebras ==
For a Boolean algebra A and a commutative monoid M, a map μ : A → M is a measure, if μ(a)=0 if and only if a=0, and μ(a ∨ b)=μ(a)+μ(b) whenever a and b are disjoint (that is, a ∧ b=0), for any a, b in A. We say in addition that μ is a Vaught measure (after Robert Lawson Vaught), or V-measure, if for all c in A and all x,y in M such that μ(c)=x+y, there are disjoint a, b in A such that c=a ∨ b, μ(a)=x, and μ(b)=y.

An element e in a commutative monoid M is measurable (with respect to M), if there are a Boolean algebra A and a V-measure μ : A → M such that μ(1)=e---we say that μ measures e. We say that M is measurable, if any element of M is measurable (with respect to M). Of course, every measurable monoid is a conical refinement monoid.

Hans Dobbertin proved in 1983 that any conical refinement monoid with at most ℵ_{1} elements is measurable. He also proved that any element in an at most countable conical refinement monoid is measured by a unique (up to isomorphism) V-measure on a unique at most countable Boolean algebra. He raised there the problem whether any conical refinement monoid is measurable. This was answered in the negative by Friedrich Wehrung in 1998. The counterexamples can have any cardinality greater than or equal to ℵ_{2}.

== Nonstable K-theory of von Neumann regular rings ==
For a ring (with unit) R, denote by FP(R) the class of finitely generated projective right R-modules. Equivalently, the objects of FP(R) are the direct summands of all modules of the form R^{n}, with n a positive integer, viewed as a right module over itself. Denote by $[X]$ the isomorphism type of an object X in FP(R). Then the set V(R) of all isomorphism types of members of FP(R), endowed with the addition defined by $[X]+[Y]=[X\oplus Y]$, is a conical commutative monoid. In addition, if R is von Neumann regular, then V(R) is a refinement monoid. It has the order-unit $[R]$. We say that V(R) encodes the nonstable K-theory of R.

For example, if R is a division ring, then the members of FP(R) are exactly the finite-dimensional right vector spaces over R, and two vector spaces are isomorphic if and only if they have the same dimension. Hence V(R) is isomorphic to the monoid $\mathbb{Z}^+=\{0,1,2,\dots\}$ of all natural numbers, endowed with its usual addition.

A slightly more complicated example can be obtained as follows. A matricial algebra over a field F is a finite product of rings of the form $M_n(F)$, the ring of all square matrices with n rows and entries in F, for variable positive integers n. A direct limit of matricial algebras over F is a locally matricial algebra over F. Every locally matricial algebra is von Neumann regular. For any locally matricial algebra R, V(R) is the positive cone of a so-called dimension group. By definition, a dimension group is a partially ordered abelian group whose underlying order is directed, whose positive cone is a refinement monoid, and which is unperforated, the letter meaning that mx≥0 implies that x≥0, for any element x of G and any positive integer m. Any simplicial group, that is, a partially ordered abelian group of the form $\mathbb{Z}^n$, is a dimension group. Effros, Handelman, and Shen proved in 1980 that dimension groups are exactly the direct limits of simplicial groups, where the transition maps are positive homomorphisms. This result had already been proved in 1976, in a slightly different form, by P. A. Grillet. Elliott proved in 1976 that the positive cone of any countable direct limit of simplicial groups is isomorphic to V(R), for some locally matricial ring R. Finally, Goodearl and Handelman proved in 1986 that the positive cone of any dimension group with at most ℵ_{1} elements is isomorphic to V(R), for some locally matricial ring R (over any given field).

Wehrung proved in 1998 that there are dimension groups with order-unit whose positive cone cannot be represented as V(R), for a von Neumann regular ring R. The given examples can have any cardinality greater than or equal to ℵ_{2}. Whether any conical refinement monoid with at most ℵ_{1} (or even ℵ_{0}) elements can be represented as V(R) for R von Neumann regular is an open problem.
