= Quotient (universal algebra) =

Result of partitioning the elements of an algebraic structure using a congruence relation

In mathematics, a quotient algebra is the result of partitioning the elements of an algebraic structure using a congruence relation. Quotient algebras are also called factor algebras. Here, the congruence relation must be an equivalence relation that is additionally compatible with all the operations of the algebra, in the formal sense described below. Its equivalence classes partition the elements of the given algebraic structure. The quotient algebra has these classes as its elements, and the compatibility conditions are used to give the classes an algebraic structure.

The idea of the quotient algebra abstracts into one common notion the quotient structure of quotient rings of ring theory, quotient groups of group theory, the quotient spaces of linear algebra and the quotient modules of representation theory into a common framework.

== Compatible relation ==
Let A be the set of the elements of an algebra $\mathcal{A}$, and let E be an equivalence relation on the set A. The relation E is said to be compatible with (or have the substitution property with respect to) an n-ary operation f, if $(a_i,\; b_i) \in E$ for $1 \le i \le n$ implies $(f (a_1, a_2, \ldots, a_n), f (b_1, b_2, \ldots, b_n)) \in E$ for any $a_i,\; b_i \in A$ with $1 \le i \le n$. An equivalence relation compatible with all the operations of an algebra is called a congruence with respect to this algebra.

== Quotient algebras and homomorphisms ==
Any equivalence relation E in a set A partitions this set in equivalence classes. The set of these equivalence classes is usually called the quotient set, and denoted A/E. For an algebra $\mathcal{A}$, it is straightforward to define the operations induced on the elements of A/E if E is a congruence. Specifically, for any operation $f^{\mathcal{A}}_i$ of arity $n_i$ in $\mathcal{A}$ (where the superscript simply denotes that it is an operation in $\mathcal{A}$, and the subscript $i \in I$ enumerates the functions in $\mathcal{A}$ and their arities) define $f^{\mathcal{A}/E}_i : (A/E)^{n_i} \to A/E$ as $f^{\mathcal{A}/E}_i ([a_1]_E, \ldots, [a_{n_i}]_E) = [f^{\mathcal{A}}_i(a_1,\ldots, a_{n_i})]_E$, where $[x]_E \in A/E$ denotes the equivalence class of $x \in A$ generated by E ("x modulo E").

For an algebra $\mathcal{A} = (A, (f^{\mathcal{A}}_i)_{i \in I})$, given a congruence E on $\mathcal{A}$, the algebra $\mathcal{A}/E = (A/E, (f^{\mathcal{A}/E}_i)_{i \in I})$ is called the quotient algebra (or factor algebra) of $\mathcal{A}$ modulo E. There is a natural homomorphism from $\mathcal{A}$ to $\mathcal{A}/E$ mapping every element to its equivalence class. In fact, every homomorphism h determines a congruence relation via the kernel of the homomorphism, $\mathop{\mathrm{ker}}\,h = \{(a,a') \in A^2\, |\, h(a) = h(a')\}\subseteq A^2$.

Given an algebra $\mathcal{A}$, a homomorphism h thus defines two algebras homomorphic to $\mathcal{A}$, the image h($\mathcal{A}$) and $\mathcal{A}/\mathop{\mathrm{ker}}\,h$ The two are isomorphic, a result known as the homomorphic image theorem or as the first isomorphism theorem for universal algebra. Formally, let $h : \mathcal{A} \to \mathcal{B}$ be a surjective homomorphism. Then, there exists a unique isomorphism g from $\mathcal{A}/\mathop{\mathrm{ker}}\,h$ onto $\mathcal{B}$ such that g composed with the natural homomorphism induced by $\mathop{\mathrm{ker}}\,h$ equals h.

== Congruence lattice ==
For every algebra $\mathcal{A}$ on the set A, the identity relation on A, and $A \times A$ are trivial congruences. An algebra with no other congruences is called simple.

Let $\mathrm{Con}(\mathcal{A})$ be the set of congruences on the algebra $\mathcal{A}$. Because congruences are closed under intersection, we can define a meet operation: $\wedge : \mathrm{Con}(\mathcal{A}) \times \mathrm{Con}(\mathcal{A}) \to \mathrm{Con}(\mathcal{A})$ by simply taking the intersection of the congruences $E_1 \wedge E_2 = E_1\cap E_2$.

On the other hand, congruences are not closed under union. However, we can define the closure of any binary relation E, with respect to a fixed algebra $\mathcal{A}$, such that it is a congruence, in the following way: $\langle E \rangle_{\mathcal{A}} = \bigcap \{ F \in \mathrm{Con}(\mathcal{A}) \mid E \subseteq F \}$. Note that the closure of a binary relation is a congruence and thus depends on the operations in $\mathcal{A}$, not just on the carrier set. Now define $\vee: \mathrm{Con}(\mathcal{A}) \times \mathrm{Con}(\mathcal{A}) \to \mathrm{Con}(\mathcal{A})$ as $E_1 \vee E_2 = \langle E_1\cup E_2 \rangle_{\mathcal{A}}$.

For every algebra $\mathcal{A}$, $(\mathrm{Con}(\mathcal{A}), \wedge, \vee)$ with the two operations defined above forms a lattice, called the congruence lattice of $\mathcal{A}$.

== Maltsev conditions ==
If two congruences permute (commute) with the composition of relations as operation, i.e. $\alpha\circ\beta = \beta\circ\alpha$, then their join (in the congruence lattice) is equal to their composition: $\alpha\circ\beta = \alpha\vee\beta$. An algebra is called congruence permutable if every pair of its congruences permutes; likewise a variety is said to be congruence-permutable if all its members are congruence-permutable algebras.

In 1954, Anatoly Maltsev established the following characterization of congruence-permutable varieties: a variety is congruence permutable if and only if there exist a ternary term q(x, y, z) such that q(x, y, y) ≈ x ≈ q(y, y, x); this is called a Maltsev term and varieties with this property are called Maltsev varieties. Maltsev's characterization explains a large number of similar results in groups (take q = xy^{−1}z), rings, quasigroups (take q = (x / (y \ y))(y \ z)), complemented lattices, Heyting algebras etc. Furthermore, every congruence-permutable algebra is congruence-modular, i.e. its lattice of congruences is modular lattice as well; the converse is not true however.

After Maltsev's result, other researchers found characterizations based on conditions similar to that found by Maltsev but for other kinds of properties. In 1967 Bjarni Jónsson found the conditions for varieties having congruence lattices that are distributive (thus called congruence-distributive varieties), while in 1969 Alan Day did the same for varieties having congruence lattices that are modular. Generically, such conditions are called Maltsev conditions.

This line of research led to the Pixley–Wille algorithm for generating Maltsev conditions associated with congruence identities.

== See also ==
- Quotient ring
- Congruence lattice problem
- Lattice of subgroups
