= Dedekind cut =

Method of construction of the real numbers

Dedekind used his cut to construct the irrational, real numbers.

In mathematics, Dedekind cuts, named after German mathematician Richard Dedekind (but previously considered by Joseph Bertrand), are а method of constructing the real numbers from the rational numbers. A Dedekind cut is a partition of the rational numbers into two nonempty sets A and B, such that each element of A is less than every element of B, and A contains no greatest element. The set B may or may not have a smallest element among the rationals. If B has a smallest element among the rationals, the cut corresponds to that rational. Otherwise, that cut defines a unique irrational number which, loosely speaking, fills the "gap" between A and B. In other words, A contains every rational number less than the cut, and B contains every rational number greater than or equal to the cut. An irrational cut is equated to an irrational number which is in neither set. Every real number, rational or not, is equated to one and only one cut of rationals.

Dedekind cuts can be generalized from the rational numbers to any totally ordered set by defining a Dedekind cut as a partition of a totally ordered set into two non-empty parts A and B, such that A is closed downwards (meaning that for all a in A, x ≤ a implies that x is in A as well) and B is closed upwards, and A contains no greatest element. See also completeness (order theory).

It is straightforward to show that a Dedekind cut among the real numbers is uniquely defined by the corresponding cut among the rational numbers. Similarly, every cut of reals is identical to the cut produced by a specific real number (which can be identified as the smallest element of the B set). In other words, the number line where every real number is defined as a Dedekind cut of rationals is a complete continuum without any further gaps.

== Definition ==
A Dedekind cut is a partition of the rationals $\mathbb{Q}$ into two subsets $A$ and $B$ such that

1. $A$ is nonempty.
2. $A \neq \mathbb{Q}$ (equivalently, $B$ is nonempty).
3. If $x, y \in \mathbb{Q}$, $x < y$, and $y \in A$, then $x \in A$. ($A$ is "closed downwards".)
4. If $x \in A$, then there exists a $y \in A$ such that $y > x$. ($A$ does not contain a greatest element.)

In concise terms, a Dedekind cut is thus a nonempty proper lower subset of $\mathbb{Q}$ with no maximal element.

By omitting the first two requirements, we formally obtain the extended real number line.

== Representations ==
It is more symmetrical to use the (A, B) notation for Dedekind cuts, but each of A and B does determine the other. It can be a simplification, in terms of notation if nothing more, to concentrate on one "half" — say, the lower one — and call any downward-closed set A without greatest element a "Dedekind cut".

If the ordered set S is complete, then, for every Dedekind cut (A, B) of S, the set B must have a minimal element b, so that A is the interval (−∞, b), and B the interval [b, +∞). In this case, we say that b is represented by the cut (A, B).

The main purpose of the Dedekind cut is to allow us to work with number sets that are not complete. The cut itself can represent a number not in the original collection of numbers (most often rational numbers). The cut can represent a number b, even though the numbers contained in the two sets A and B do not actually include the number b that their cut represents.

For example if A and B only contain rational numbers, they can still be cut at $\sqrt{2}$ by putting every negative rational number in A, along with every non-negative rational number whose square is less than 2; similarly B would contain every positive rational number whose square is greater than or equal to 2. Even though there is no rational value for $\sqrt{2}$, if the rational numbers are partitioned into A and B this way, the partition itself represents an irrational number.

== Ordering of cuts ==
Regard one Dedekind cut (A, B) as less than another Dedekind cut (C, D) (of the same superset) if A is a proper subset of C. Equivalently, if D is a proper subset of B, the cut (A, B) is again less than (C, D). In this way, set inclusion can be used to represent the ordering of numbers, and all other relations (greater than, less than or equal to, equal to, and so on) can be similarly created from set relations.

The set of all Dedekind cuts is itself a linearly ordered set (of sets). Moreover, the set of Dedekind cuts has the least-upper-bound property, i.e., every nonempty subset of it that has any upper bound has a least upper bound. Thus, constructing the set of Dedekind cuts serves the purpose of embedding the original ordered set S, which might not have had the least-upper-bound property, within a (usually larger) linearly ordered set that does have this useful property.

== Construction of the real numbers ==
A typical Dedekind cut of the rational numbers $\Q$ is given by the partition $(A,B)$ with

$$A = \{ a\in\mathbb{Q} : a^2 < 2 \text{ or } a < 0 \},$$
$B = \{ b\in\mathbb{Q} : b^2 \ge 2 \text{ and } b \ge 0 \}.$

This cut represents the irrational number $\sqrt{2}$ in Dedekind's construction. The essential idea is that we use a set $A$, which is the set of all rational numbers whose squares are less than 2, to "represent" the number $\sqrt{2}$, and further, by defining properly arithmetic operators over these sets (addition, subtraction, multiplication, and division), these sets (together with these arithmetic operations) form the familiar field of real numbers.

To establish this, one must show that $A$ really is a cut (according to the definition) and the square of $A$, that is $A \times A$ (please refer to the link above for the precise definition of how the multiplication of cuts is defined), is $2$ (note that rigorously speaking this number 2 is represented by a cut $\{x\ |\ x \in \mathbb{Q}, x < 2\}$). To show the first part, we show that for any positive rational $x$ with $x^2 < 2$, there is a rational $y$ with $x < y$ and $y^2 < 2$. The choice $y=\frac{2x+2}{x+2}$ works, thus $A$ is indeed a cut. Now armed with the multiplication between cuts, it is easy to check that $A \times A \le 2$ (essentially, this is because $x \times y \le 2, \forall x, y \in A, x, y \ge 0$). Therefore, to show that $A \times A = 2$, we show that $A \times A \ge 2$, and it suffices to show that for any $r < 2$, there exists $x \in A$, $x^2 > r$. For this we notice that if $x > 0, 2-x^2=\epsilon > 0$, then $2-y^2 \le \frac{\epsilon}{2}$ for the $y$ constructed above, this means that we have a sequence in $A$ whose square can become arbitrarily close to $2$, which finishes the proof.

Note that the equality b^{2} = 2 cannot hold since $\sqrt{2}$ is not rational.

== Relation to interval arithmetic ==
Given a Dedekind cut representing the real number $r$ by splitting the rationals into $(A,B)$ where rationals in $A$ are less than $r$ and rationals in $B$ are greater than $r$, it can be equivalently represented as the set of pairs $(a,b)$ with $a \in A$ and $b \in B$, with the lower cut and the upper cut being given by projections. This corresponds exactly to the set of intervals approximating $r$.

This allows the basic arithmetic operations on the real numbers to be defined in terms of interval arithmetic. This property and its relation with real numbers given only in terms of $A$ and $B$ is particularly important in weaker foundations such as constructive analysis.

== Generalizations ==
=== Arbitrary linearly ordered sets ===
In the general case of an arbitrary linearly ordered set X, a cut is a pair $(A,B)$ such that $A \cup B = X$ and $a \in A$, $b \in B$ imply $a < b$. Some authors add the requirement that both A and B are nonempty.

If neither A has a maximum, nor B has a minimum, the cut is called a gap. A linearly ordered set endowed with the order topology is compact if and only if it has no gap.

=== Surreal numbers ===
A construction resembling Dedekind cuts is used for (one among many possible) constructions of surreal numbers. The relevant notion in this case is a Cuesta-Dutari cut, named after the Spanish mathematician Norberto Cuesta Dutari.

=== Partially ordered sets ===
More generally, if S is a partially ordered set, a completion of S means a complete lattice L with an order-embedding of S into L. The notion of complete lattice generalizes the least-upper-bound property of the reals.

One completion of S is the set of its downwardly closed subsets, ordered by inclusion. A related completion that preserves all existing sups and infs of S is obtained by the following construction: For each subset A of S, let A^{u} denote the set of upper bounds of A, and let A^{l} denote the set of lower bounds of A. (These operators form a Galois connection.) Then the Dedekind–MacNeille completion of S consists of all subsets A for which (A^{u})^{l} = A; it is ordered by inclusion. The Dedekind-MacNeille completion is the smallest complete lattice with S embedded in it.
