= Mesocompact space =

In mathematics, in the field of general topology, a topological space is said to be mesocompact if every open cover has a compact-finite open refinement. That is, given any open cover, we can find an open refinement with the property that every compact set meets only finitely many members of the refinement.

The following facts are true about mesocompactness:

- Every compact space, and more generally every paracompact space is mesocompact. This follows from the fact that any locally finite cover is automatically compact-finite.
- Every mesocompact space is metacompact, and hence also orthocompact. This follows from the fact that points are compact, and hence any compact-finite cover is automatically point finite.
