= Development (topology) =

In the mathematical field of topology, a development is a countable collection of open covers of a topological space that satisfies certain separation axioms.

Let $X$ be a topological space. A development for $X$ is a countable collection $F_1, F_2, \ldots$ of open coverings of $X$, such that for any closed subset $C \subset X$ and any point $p$ in the complement of $C$, there exists a cover $F_j$ such that no element of $F_j$ which contains $p$ intersects $C$. A space with a development is called developable.

A development $F_1, F_2,\ldots$ such that $F_{i+1}\subset F_i$ for all $i$ is called a nested development. A theorem from Vickery states that every developable space in fact has a nested development. If $F_{i+1}$ is a refinement of $F_i$, for all $i$, then the development is called a refined development.

Vickery's theorem implies that a topological space is a Moore space if and only if it is regular and developable.

== See also ==
- Moore space
- Metacompact space
- Paracompact space
- Metrizable space
- Covering dimension
- Refinement (topology)
