= Weakly compact =

Weakly compact can refer to:

- Weakly compact cardinal, an infinite cardinal number on which every binary relation has an equally large homogeneous subset
- Weakly compact set, a compact set in a space with the weak topology
- Weakly compact set, a set that has some but not all of the properties of compact sets, for example:
  - Sequentially compact space, a set in which every infinite sequence has a convergent subsequence
  - Limit point compact, a set in which every infinite subset of X has a limit point
