= Cocountable topology =

Topology made of cocountable subsets

The cocountable topology, also known as the countable complement topology, is a topology that can be defined on any infinite set $X$. In this topology, a set is open if its complement in $X$ is either countable or equal to the entire set. Equivalently, the open sets consist of the empty set and all subsets of $X$ whose complements are countable, a property known as cocountability. The only closed sets in this topology are $X$ itself and the countable subsets of $X$.

== Definitions ==
Let $X$ be an infinite set and let $\mathcal{T}$ be the set of subsets of $X$ such that
$$H \in \mathcal{T} \iff X \setminus H \mbox{ is countable, or}\, H = \varnothing$$
then $\mathcal{T}$ is the countable complement topology on $X$, and the topological space $T = ( X , \mathcal{T} )$ is a countable complement space.

Symbolically, the topology is typically written as
$$\mathcal{T} = \{H \subseteq X : H = \varnothing \mbox{ or } X \setminus H \mbox{ is countable} \}.$$

=== Double pointed cocountable topology ===
Let $X$ be an uncountable set. We define the topology $\mathcal{T}$ as all open sets whose complements are countable, along with $\varnothing$ and $X$ itself.

=== Cocountable extension topology ===
Let $X$ be the real line. Now let $\mathcal{T}_1$ be the Euclidean topology and $\mathcal{T}_2$ be the cocountable topology on $X$. The cocountable extension topology is the smallest topology generated by $\mathcal{T}_1 \cup \mathcal{T}_2$.

== Proof that cocountable topology is a topology ==
By definition, the empty set $\varnothing$ is an element of $\mathcal{T}$. Similarly, the entire set $X \in \mathcal{T}$, since the complement of $X$ relative to itself is the empty set, which is vacuously countable.

Suppose $A, B \in \mathcal{T}$. Let $H = A \cap B$. Then

$X \setminus H = X \setminus (A \cap B) = (X \setminus A) \cup (X \setminus B)$

by De Morgan's laws. Since $A, B \in \mathcal{T}$, it follows that $X \setminus A$ and $X \setminus B$ are both countable. Because the countable union of countable sets is countable, $X \setminus H$ is also countable. Therefore, $H = A \cap B \in \mathcal{T}$, as its complement is countable.

Now let $\mathcal{U} \subseteq \mathcal{T}$. Then

$X \setminus \left( \bigcup \mathcal{U} \right) = \bigcap_{U \in \mathcal{U}} (X \setminus U)$

again by De Morgan's laws. For each $U \in \mathcal{U}$, $X \setminus U$ is countable. The countable intersection of countable sets is also countable (assuming $\mathcal{U}$ is countable), so $S \setminus \left( \bigcup \mathcal{U} \right)$ is countable. Thus, $\bigcup \mathcal{U} \in \mathcal{T}$.

Since all three open set axioms are met, $\mathcal{T}$ is a topology on $X$.

== Properties ==
Every set $X$ with the cocountable topology is Lindelöf, since every nonempty open set omits only countably many points of $X$. It is also T_{1}, as all singletons are closed.

If $X$ is an uncountable set, then any two nonempty open sets intersect, hence, the space is not Hausdorff. However, in the cocountable topology all convergent sequences are eventually constant, so limits are unique. Since compact sets in $X$ are finite subsets, all compact subsets are closed, another condition usually related to the Hausdorff separation axiom.

The cocountable topology on a countable set is the discrete topology. The cocountable topology on an uncountable set is hyperconnected, thus connected, locally connected and pseudocompact, but neither weakly countably compact nor countably metacompact, hence not compact.

== Examples ==
- Uncountable set: On any uncountable set, such as the real numbers $\mathbb{R}$, the cocountable topology is a proper subset of the standard topology. In this case, the topology is T_{1} but not Hausdorff, first-countable, nor metrizable.
- Countable set (possibly finite): If $X$ is countable, then every subset of $X$ has a countable complement. In this case, the cocountable topology is just the discrete topology.
- Subspace topology: If $Y \subseteq X$ and $X$ carries the cocountable topology, then $Y$ inherits the subspace topology. This topology on $Y$ consists of the empty set, all of $Y$, and all subsets $U \subseteq Y$ such that $Y \setminus U$ is countable.

== See also ==
- Cofinite topology
- List of topologies
