= Pseudocompact space =

Topological space with a bounded image under any continuous function to R

In mathematics, in the field of topology, a topological space is said to be pseudocompact if its image under any continuous function to R is bounded. Many authors include the requirement that the space be completely regular in the definition of pseudocompactness. Pseudocompact spaces were defined by Edwin Hewitt in 1948.

== Properties related to pseudocompactness ==
- For a Tychonoff space X to be pseudocompact requires that every locally finite collection of non-empty open sets of X be finite. There are many equivalent conditions for pseudocompactness (sometimes some separation axiom should be assumed); a large number of them are quoted in Stephenson 2003. Some historical remarks about earlier results can be found in Engelking 1989, p. 211.
- Every countably compact space is pseudocompact. For normal Hausdorff spaces the converse is true.
- As a consequence of the above result, every sequentially compact space is pseudocompact. The converse is true for metric spaces. As sequential compactness is an equivalent condition to compactness for metric spaces this implies that compactness is an equivalent condition to pseudocompactness for metric spaces also.
- The weaker result that every compact space is pseudocompact is easily proved: the image of a compact space under any continuous function is compact, and every compact set in a metric space is bounded.
- If Y is the continuous image of pseudocompact X, then Y is pseudocompact. Note that for continuous functions g : X → Y and h : Y → R, the composition of g and h, called f, is a continuous function from X to the real numbers. Therefore, f is bounded, and Y is pseudocompact.
- Let X be an infinite set given the particular point topology. Then X is neither compact, sequentially compact, countably compact, paracompact nor metacompact (although it is orthocompact). However, since X is hyperconnected, it is pseudocompact. This shows that pseudocompactness doesn't imply any of these other forms of compactness.
- For a Hausdorff space X to be compact requires that X be pseudocompact and realcompact (see Engelking 1968, p. 153).
- For a Tychonoff space X to be compact requires that X be pseudocompact and metacompact (see Watson).

== Pseudocompact topological groups ==
A relatively refined theory is available for pseudocompact topological groups. In particular, W. W. Comfort and Kenneth A. Ross proved that a product of pseudocompact topological groups is still pseudocompact (this might fail for arbitrary topological spaces).

== See also ==
- Compact space
- Paracompact space
- Normal space
- Realcompact space
- Metacompact space
- Orthocompact space
- Tychonoff space
