= Long line (topology) =

Topological space in mathematics

In topology, the long line (or Alexandroff line) is a topological space somewhat similar to the real line, but in a certain sense "longer". It behaves locally just like the real line, but has different large-scale properties (e.g., it is neither Lindelöf nor separable). Therefore, it serves as an important counterexample in topology. Intuitively, the usual real-number line consists of a countable number of line segments $[0,1)$ laid end-to-end, whereas the long line is constructed from an uncountable number of such segments.

== Definition ==
The closed long ray $L$ is defined as the Cartesian product of the first uncountable ordinal $\omega_1$ with the half-open interval $[0, 1),$ equipped with the order topology that arises from the lexicographical order on $\omega_1 \times [0,1)$. The open long ray is obtained from the closed long ray by removing the smallest element $(0, 0).$

The long line is obtained by "gluing" together two long rays, one in the positive direction and the other in the negative direction. More rigorously, it can be defined as the order topology on the disjoint union of the reversed open long ray (“reversed” means the order is reversed) (this is the negative half) and the (not reversed) closed long ray (the positive half), totally ordered by letting the points of the latter be greater than the points of the former. Alternatively, take two copies of the open long ray and identify the open interval $\{ 0 \} \times (0, 1)$ of the one with the same interval of the other but reversing the interval, that is, identify the point $(0, t)$ (where $t$ is a real number such that $0 < t < 1$) of the one with the point $(0, 1 - t)$ of the other, and define the long line to be the topological space obtained by gluing the two open long rays along the open interval identified between the two. (The former construction is better in the sense that it defines the order on the long line and shows that the topology is the order topology; the latter is better in the sense that it uses gluing along an open set, which is clearer from the topological point of view.)

Intuitively, the closed long ray is like a real (closed) half-line, except that it is much longer in one direction: we say that it is long at one end and closed at the other. The long line is longer than the real lines in both directions: we say that it is long in both directions.

However, many authors speak of the “long line” where we have spoken of the (closed or open) long ray, and there is much confusion between the various long spaces. In many uses or counterexamples, however, the distinction is unessential, because the important part is the “long” end of the line, and it doesn't matter what happens at the other end (whether long, short, or closed).

A related space, the (closed) extended long ray, $L^*,$ is obtained as the one-point compactification of $L$ by adjoining an additional element to the right end of $L.$ One can similarly define the extended long line by adding two elements to the long line, one at each end.

== Properties ==
The closed long ray $L = \omega_1 \times [0, 1)$ consists of an uncountable number of copies of $[0, 1)$ "pasted together" end-to-end. Compare this with the fact that for any countable ordinal $\alpha$, pasting together $\alpha$ copies of $[0, 1)$ gives a space which is still homeomorphic (and order-isomorphic) to $[0, 1).$ Moreover, if we tried to glue together more than $\omega_1$ copies of $[0, 1),$ the resulting space would no longer be locally homeomorphic to $\R$.

Every increasing sequence in $L$ converges to a limit in $L$; this is a consequence of following facts: the elements of $\omega_1$ are the countable ordinals, the supremum of every countable family of countable ordinals is a countable ordinal, and every increasing and bounded sequence of real numbers converges. Consequently, there can be no strictly increasing function $L \to \R$. In fact, every continuous function $L \to \R$ is eventually constant.

As order topologies, the (possibly extended) long rays and lines are normal Hausdorff spaces. All of them have the same cardinality as the real line and all of them are locally compact. None are metrizable; this can be seen as the long ray is sequentially compact but not compact, nor even Lindelöf.

The (non-extended) long line or ray is not paracompact. It is path-connected, locally path-connected and simply connected but not contractible. It is a one-dimensional topological manifold, with boundary in the case of the closed ray. It is first-countable but not second countable and not separable, so authors who require the latter properties in their manifolds do not call the long line a manifold.

It makes sense to consider all the long spaces at once because every connected (non-empty) one-dimensional (not necessarily separable) topological manifold possibly with boundary, is homeomorphic to either the real line, the circle, the half-open interval, the closed interval, the open long ray, the closed long ray, the long circle (constructed by identifying the ends of the closed long ray), or the long line.

The long line or ray can be equipped with the structure of a (non-separable) differentiable manifold, with boundary in the case of the closed ray. However, contrary to the topological structure which is unique (topologically, there is only one way to make the real line "longer" at either end), the differentiable structure is not unique: in fact, there are uncountably many ($2^{\aleph_1}$ to be precise) pairwise non-diffeomorphic smooth structures on it. This is in sharp contrast to the real line, where there are also different smooth structures, but all of them are diffeomorphic to the standard one.

The long line or ray can even be equipped with the structure of a (real) analytic manifold, with boundary in the case of the closed ray. However, this is much more difficult than for the differentiable case: it depends on the classification of (separable) one-dimensional analytic manifolds, which is more difficult than for differentiable manifolds. Again, any given smooth structure can be extended in infinitely many ways to different analytic structures, which are pairwise non-diffeomorphic as analytic manifolds.

The long line or ray cannot be equipped with a Riemannian metric that induces its topology. The reason is that Riemannian manifolds, even without the assumption of paracompactness, can be shown to be metrizable.

The extended long ray $L^*$ is compact. It is the one-point compactification of the closed long ray $L,$ but it is also its Stone-Čech compactification, because any continuous function from the (closed or open) long ray to the real line is eventually constant. $L^*$ is also connected, but not path-connected because the long line is "too long" to be covered by a path, which is a continuous image of an interval. $L^*$ is not a manifold and is not first countable.

== p-adic analog ==
There exists a p-adic analog of the long line, which is due to George Bergman.

This space is constructed as the increasing union of an uncountable directed set of copies $X_{\gamma}$ of the ring of $p$-adic integers, indexed by a countable ordinal $\gamma.$ Define a map from $X_{\delta}$to $X_{\gamma}$ whenever $\delta < \gamma$ as follows:

- If $\gamma$ is a successor $\varepsilon + 1$ then the map from $X_{\varepsilon}$ to $X_{\gamma}$ is just multiplication by $p.$ For other $\delta$ the map from $X_{\delta}$ to $X_{\gamma}$ is the composition of the map from $X_{\delta}$ to $X_{\varepsilon}$ and the map from $X_{\varepsilon}$ to $X_{\gamma}.$
- If $\gamma$ is a limit ordinal then the direct limit of the sets $X_{\delta}$ for $\delta < \gamma$ is a countable union of p-adic balls, so can be embedded in $X_{\gamma},$ as $X_{\gamma}$ with a point removed is also a countable union of p-adic balls. This defines compatible embeddings of $X_{\delta}$ into $X_{\gamma}$ for all $\delta < \gamma.$

This space is not compact, but the union of any countable set of compact subspaces has compact closure.

== Higher dimensions ==
Some examples of non-paracompact manifolds in higher dimensions include the Prüfer manifold, products of any non-paracompact manifold with any non-empty manifold, the ball of long radius, and so on. The bagpipe theorem shows that there are $2^{\aleph_1}$ isomorphism classes of non-paracompact surfaces, even when a generalization of paracompactness, ω-boundedness, is assumed.

There are no complex analogues of the long line as every Riemann surface is paracompact, but Calabi and Rosenlicht gave an example of a non-paracompact complex manifold of complex dimension 2.

== See also ==
- Lexicographic order topology on the unit square
- List of topologies
