= Bagpipe theorem =

On structure of ω-bounded connected surfaces

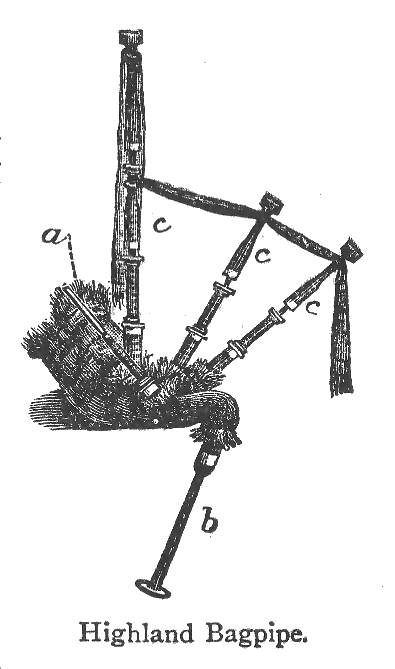
A bagpipe, which has a similar shape as the surfaces considered in the bagpipe theorem

In mathematics, the bagpipe theorem of Peter Nyikos describes the structure of the connected (but possibly non-paracompact) ω-bounded surfaces by showing that they are "bagpipes": the connected sum of a compact "bag" with several "long pipes".

== Statement ==
A space is called ω-bounded if the closure of every countable set is compact. Compactness implies ω-boundedness, but in general the converse is not true. For example, the first uncountable ordinal $\omega_1$ with the order topology and the long line are both ω-bounded but not compact. For metric spaces, however, the two concepts are equivalent.

The bagpipe theorem states that every ω-bounded connected surface is the connected sum of a compact connected surface and a finite number of long pipes (defined below).

A space P is called a long pipe if there exist subspaces $\{U_\alpha: \alpha < \omega_1 \}$ each of which is homeomorphic to $S^1 \times \mathbb{R}$ such that for $n<m$, $\overline{U_n} \subseteq U_m$ and the boundary of $U_n$ in $U_m$ is homeomorphic to $S^1$. The simplest example of a long pipe is the product $S^1 \times L^+$ of the circle $S^1$ and the long closed ray $L^+$, which is an increasing union of $\omega_1$ copies of the half-open interval $[0,1)$, pasted together with the lexicographic ordering. Another long pipe is obtained by removing a single point from the "long plane" $L \times L$, where $L$ is the long line. There are in fact $2^{\aleph_1}$ different isomorphism classes of long pipes.

The bagpipe theorem does not describe all surfaces since there are many examples of surfaces that are not ω-bounded, such as the Prüfer manifold.
