= Ω-bounded space =

In mathematics, an ω-bounded space is a topological space in which the closure of every countable subset is compact. More generally, if P is some property of subspaces, then a P-bounded space is one in which every subspace with property P has compact closure.

Every compact space is ω-bounded, and every ω-bounded space is countably compact. The long line is ω-bounded but not compact.

The bagpipe theorem describes the ω-bounded surfaces.
