= Rado's theorem =

In mathematics, Rado's theorem or Radó's theorem may refer to:

- Tibor Radó's theorem (harmonic functions)
- Tibor Radó's theorem (Riemann surfaces)
- Richard Rado's theorem (Ramsey theory)
- Richard Rado's theorem (matroid theory)
