= Thin set =

In mathematics, thin set may refer to:

- Thin set (analysis) in analysis of several complex variables
- Thin set (Serre) in algebraic geometry
- In set theory, a set that is not a stationary set

Thin set can also refer to thin set mortar.

== See also ==
- Meagre set
- Shrinking space
- Slender group
- Small set
- Thin category
