= A-paracompact space =

In mathematics, in the field of topology, a topological space is said to be a-paracompact if every open cover of the space has a locally finite refinement. In contrast to the definition of paracompactness, the refinement is not required to be open.

Every paracompact space is a-paracompact, and in regular spaces the two notions coincide.
