= Developable =

In mathematics, the term developable may refer to:

- A developable space in general topology.
- A developable surface in geometry.
- A tangent developable surface of a space curve
