= Point-finite collection =

Topological concept for collections of sets

In mathematics, a collection or family $\mathcal{U}$ of subsets of a topological space $X$ is said to be point-finite if every point of $X$ lies in only finitely many members of $\mathcal{U}.$

A metacompact space is a topological space in which every open cover admits a point-finite open refinement. Every locally finite collection of subsets of a topological space is also point-finite. A topological space in which every open cover admits a locally finite open refinement is called a paracompact space. Every paracompact space is therefore metacompact.

== Dieudonné's theorem ==
Theorem— A topological space $X$ is normal if and only if each point-finite open cover of $X$ has a shrinking; that is, if $\{ U_i \mid i \in I \}$ is an open cover indexed by a set $I$, there is an open cover $\{ V_i \mid i \in I \}$ indexed by the same set $I$ such that $\overline{V_i} \subset U_i$ for each $i \in I$.

The original proof uses Zorn's lemma, while Willard uses transfinite recursion.
