= Dieudonné plank =

Example of a metacompact topological space that is not paracompact

In mathematics, the Dieudonné plank is a specific topological space introduced by Dieudonné (1944). It is an example of a metacompact space that is not paracompact.

The notion has since been generalized (by Barr et al.) to that of an absolute CR-epic space.
