= Locally finite =

The term locally finite has a number of different meanings in mathematics:

- Locally finite collection of sets in a topological space
- Locally finite graph
- Locally finite group
- Locally finite measure
- Locally finite operator in linear algebra
- Locally finite poset
- Locally finite space, a topological space in which each point has a finite neighborhood
- Locally finite variety in the sense of universal algebra
