= Covering problem of Rado =

Unsolved problem in mathematics
What is the arrangements of squares with parallel edges which has the smallest area-maximizing subset of squares in which the squares in the subset do not overlap?
More unsolved problems in mathematics

The covering problem of Rado is an unsolved problem in geometry concerning covering planar sets by squares. It was formulated in 1928 by Tibor Radó and has been generalized to more general shapes and higher dimensions by Richard Rado.

== Formulation ==
In a letter to Wacław Sierpiński, motivated by some results of Giuseppe Vitali, Tibor Radó observed that for every covering of a unit interval, one can select a subset consisting of pairwise disjoint intervals with total length at least 1/2 and that this number cannot be improved.

Coverings of the unit interval (spread vertically for visual clarity). One can always select a number of segments that are covering this interval such that none of the selected segments overlap each other, and the total length of the segments is greater or equal to 1/2, demonstrated above by the selected (red) segments.

He then asked for an analogous statement in the plane.

If the area of the union of a finite set of squares in the plane with parallel sides is one, what is the guaranteed maximum total area of a pairwise disjoint subset?

To have the squares be as far apart as possible while still having them overlap, the $\epsilon$ symbol is used to denote an infinitesimally small scaling value, which expands the square by that amount from the center, and as that value reaches zero, the lower bound is approached. The total area covered by all squares in each approaches 1 as $\epsilon$ shrinks, and the amount covered by an optimal selection of squares for these sets approaches 1/4 (where the selected squares are red). Note that there are arrangements which have an optimal selection with total area slightly less than 1/4.

Radó proved that this number is at least 1/9 and conjectured that it is at least 1/4 a constant which cannot be further improved. This assertion was proved for the case of equal squares independently by A. Sokolin, R. Rado, and V. A. Zalgaller. However, in 1973, Miklós Ajtai disproved Radó's conjecture, by constructing a system of squares of two different sizes for which any subsystem consisting of disjoint squares covers the area at most 1/4 − 1/1728 ≈ 0.2494 of the total area covered by the system.

== Upper and lower bounds ==
Problems analogous to Tibor Radó's conjecture but involving other shapes were considered by Richard Rado starting in late 1940s. A typical setting is a finite family of convex figures in the Euclidean space R^{d} that are homothetic to a given X, for example, a square as in the original question, a disk, or a d-dimensional cube. Let

$$F(X)=\inf_{S}\sup_{I}\frac{|I|}{|S|},$$

where S ranges over finite families just described, and for a given family S, I ranges over all subfamilies that are independent, i.e. consist of disjoint sets, and bars denote the total volume (or area, in the plane case). Although the exact value of F(X) is not known for any two-dimensional convex X, much work was devoted to establishing upper and lower bounds in various classes of shapes. By considering only families consisting of sets that are parallel and congruent to X, one similarly defines f(X), which turned out to be much easier to study. Thus, R. Rado proved that if X is a triangle, f(X) is exactly 1/6 and if X is a centrally symmetric hexagon, f(X) is equal to 1/4.

In 2008, Sergey Bereg, Adrian Dumitrescu, and Minghui Jiang established new bounds for various F(X) and f(X) that improve upon earlier results of R. Rado and V. A. Zalgaller. In particular, they proved that

$$0.1179 \approx \frac{1}{8.4797} \leq F(\textrm{square}) \leq \frac{1}{4}-\frac{1}{384} \approx 0.2474,$$

and that $f(X)\geq\frac{1}{6}$ for any convex planar X.
