= Countably compact space =

In mathematics a topological space is called countably compact if every countable open cover has a finite subcover.

== Equivalent definitions ==
A topological space X is called countably compact if it satisfies any of the following equivalent conditions:

(1) Every countable open cover of X has a finite subcover.
(2) Every infinite set A in X has an ω-accumulation point in X.
(3) Every sequence in X has an accumulation point in X.
(4) Every countable family of closed subsets of X with an empty intersection has a finite subfamily with an empty intersection.

Proof of equivalence

(1) $\Rightarrow$ (2): Suppose (1) holds and A is an infinite subset of X without $\omega$-accumulation point. By taking a subset of A if necessary, we can assume that A is countable. Every $x\in X$ has an open neighbourhood $O_x$ such that $O_x\cap A$ is finite (possibly empty), since x is not an ω-accumulation point. For every finite subset F of A define $O_F = \cup\{O_x: O_x\cap A=F\}$. Every $O_x$ is a subset of one of the $O_F$, so the $O_F$ cover X. Since there are countably many of them, the $O_F$ form a countable open cover of X. But every $O_F$ intersect A in a finite subset (namely F), so finitely many of them cannot cover A, let alone X. This contradiction proves (2).

(2) $\Rightarrow$ (3): Suppose (2) holds, and let $(x_n)_n$ be a sequence in X. If the sequence has a value x that occurs infinitely many times, that value is an accumulation point of the sequence. Otherwise, every value in the sequence occurs only finitely many times and the set $A=\{x_n: n\in\mathbb N\}$ is infinite and so has an ω-accumulation point x. That x is then an accumulation point of the sequence, as is easily checked.

(3) $\Rightarrow$ (1): Suppose (3) holds and $\{O_n: n\in\mathbb N\}$ is a countable open cover without a finite subcover. Then for each $n$ we can choose a point $x_n\in X$ that is not in $\cup_{i=1}^n O_i$. The sequence $(x_n)_n$ has an accumulation point x and that x is in some $O_k$. But then $O_k$ is a neighborhood of x that does not contain any of the $x_n$ with $n>k$, so x is not an accumulation point of the sequence after all. This contradiction proves (1).

(4) $\Leftrightarrow$ (1): Conditions (1) and (4) are easily seen to be equivalent by taking complements.

== Examples ==
- The first uncountable ordinal (with the order topology) is an example of a countably compact space that is not compact.

== Properties ==
- Every compact space is countably compact.
- A countably compact space is compact if and only if it is Lindelöf.
- Every countably compact space is limit point compact.
- For T1 spaces, countable compactness and limit point compactness are equivalent.
- Every sequentially compact space is countably compact. The converse does not hold. For example, the product of continuum-many closed intervals $[0,1]$ with the product topology is compact and hence countably compact; but it is not sequentially compact.
- For first-countable spaces, countable compactness and sequential compactness are equivalent. More generally, the same holds for sequential spaces.
- For metrizable spaces, countable compactness, sequential compactness, limit point compactness and compactness are all equivalent. The same holds for second countable Hausdorff spaces.
- The example of the set of all real numbers with the standard topology shows that neither local compactness nor σ-compactness nor paracompactness imply countable compactness.
- Closed subspaces of a countably compact space are countably compact.
- The continuous image of a countably compact space is countably compact.
- Every countably compact space is pseudocompact.
- In a countably compact space, every locally finite family of nonempty subsets is finite.
- Every countably compact paracompact space is compact. More generally, every countably compact metacompact space is compact.
- Every countably compact Hausdorff first-countable space is regular.
- Every normal countably compact space is collectionwise normal.
- The product of a compact space and a countably compact space is countably compact.
- The product of two countably compact spaces need not be countably compact.

== See also ==
- Sequentially compact space
- Compact space
- Limit point compact
- Lindelöf space
