= Large set =

In mathematics, the term large set is sometimes used to refer to any set that is "large" in some sense. It has specialized meanings in three branches of mathematics:

- Large set (category theory), a set that does not belong to a fixed universe of sets
- Large set (combinatorics), a set of integers whose sum of reciprocals diverges
- Large set (Ramsey theory), a set of integers with the property that, if all the integers are colored, one of the color classes has long arithmetic progressions whose differences are in the set

== See also ==
- Natural density
- Small set (disambiguation)
