= Robert Sorgenfrey =

American mathematician

- Born: August 14, 1915; Sunbury, Iowa
- Died: January 7, 1996 (aged 80); Los Angeles, California
- Education: University of Texas at Austin (PhD); University of California, Los Angeles (undergrad)
- Scientific career
- Fields: general topology
- Workplaces: University of California, Los Angeles
- Thesis: Concerning Triodic Continua (1941)
- Doctoral advisor: R.L. Moore

Robert Henry Sorgenfrey (August 14, 1915 – January 7, 1996) was an American mathematician and Professor of Mathematics at the University of California, Los Angeles at UCLA until his retirement in 1979. The Sorgenfrey line and the Sorgenfrey plane are named after him; the Sorgenfrey line was the first example of a normal topological space whose product with itself is not normal.
