= Michael's theorem on paracompact spaces =

Theorem in topology

In mathematics, Michael's theorem gives sufficient conditions for a regular topological space (in fact, for a T_{1}-space) to be paracompact.

== Statement ==
A family $E_i$ of subsets of a topological space is said to be closure-preserving if for every subfamily $E_{i_j}$,

$$\overline{\bigcup E_{i_j}} = \bigcup \overline{E_{i_j}}$$.

For example, a locally finite family of subsets has this property. With this terminology, the theorem states:

Theorem—Let $X$ be a regular-Hausdorff topological space. Then the following are equivalent.

1. $X$ is paracompact.
2. Each open cover has a closure-preserving refinement, not necessarily open.
3. Each open cover has a closure-preserving closed refinement.
4. Each open cover has a refinement that is a countable union of closure-preserving families of open sets.

Frequently, the theorem is stated in the following form:

Corollary—A regular-Hausdorff topological space is paracompact if and only if each open cover has a refinement that is a countable union of locally finite families of open sets.

In particular, a regular-Hausdorff Lindelöf space is paracompact. The proof of the theorem uses the following result which does not need regularity:

Proposition—Let X be a T_{1}-space. If X satisfies property 3 in the theorem, then X is paracompact.

=== Proof of Theorem from Proposition ===
Here is a proof sketch of the theorem from the proposition.

(1) $\Rightarrow$ (2) trivial. (2) $\Rightarrow$ (3) Since $X$ is regular, we can find an open cover $\mathcal{V} = \{ V_x \mid x \in X \}$ such that $\{ \overline{V_x} \mid x \in X \}$ is a refinement of a given open cover $\mathcal U$. By (2), $\mathcal{V}$ has a closure-preserving refinement $\mathcal{C}$. Then $\{ \overline{C} \mid C \in \mathcal{C} \}$ is a refinement of $\mathcal{U}$ and is clearly closure-preserving.

(3) $\Rightarrow$ (4) by Proposition, and (4) $\Rightarrow$ (1) again by Proposition with the aid of Lemma 2 below. $\square$

== Examples ==
Here are some examples of refinements satisfying the condition of the corollary.

- A countable open refinement trivially satisfies the condition of the corollary. Thus, a regular (Hausdorff) Lindelöf space is paracompact.
- Let $X$ be a metric space and $U_a, a \in A$ an open cover indexed by a well-ordered set $A$. Then let
  $$U_{a, n} = \{ x \mid d(x, X - U_a) > 2^{-n} \},$$
  $$T_{a, n} = U_{a, n} \cap (\cap_{b < a}(X - U_b)).$$

Then $d(T_{a, n}, T_{b, n}) \ge 2^{-n}$ for $b \ne a$ and, from that, for each $n$, one can choose neighborhoods $V_{a, n} \supset T_{a, n}$ inside $U_{a, n}$ such that $\{ V_{a, n} \mid a \}$ is locally finite. Then $\{ V_{a, n} \mid a, n \}$ is a refinement satisfying the condition of the corollary, and we conclude $X$ is paracompact.

== Proof ==
=== Lemmas ===
The proof of the proposition uses the following general lemmas:

Lemma 1—Let X be a topological space. If each open cover of it admits a locally finite closed refinement, then each open cover admits a locally finite open refinement (thus paracompact when X is Hausdorff).

Proof: Given an open cover $\mathcal{U}$, let $\mathcal{A}$ be a locally finite closed refinement of it. By "locally finite", we can find an open cover $\{ V_x \mid x \in X \}$ of $X$ such that each $V_x$ intersects only finitely many sets in $\mathcal A$. Then let $\mathcal F$ be a locally finite closed refinement of $\{ V_x \mid x \}$. Then, for each $A \in \mathcal A$,

$$W(A) := \cap \{ X - F \mid F \in \mathcal{F}, \, F \cap A = \emptyset \}$$

is an open set since $\mathcal{F}$ is locally finite; thus, closure-preserving. Let $U : \mathcal{A} \to \mathcal{U}$ be a function such that $A \subset U(A)$ and then let

$$A' = U(A) \cap W(A),$$

which is open. Then $\{ A' \mid A \in \mathcal{A} \}$ is a locally finite open refinement of $\mathcal U$ (use $\mathcal F$ is a locally finite cover). $\square$

Lemma 2—Let X be a topological space. Each open cover of $X$ that is a countable union of locally finite collections has a locally finite refinement consisting of locally-closed sets.

Also, if $\mathcal{V}$ is a countable union of closure-preserving collections of open sets, then $\{ \overline{V} \mid V \in \mathcal V \}$ has a closure-preserving closed refinement.

Proof: Let $\mathcal{U} = \cup_1^{\infty} \mathcal{U}_n$ be an open cover that is a countable union of locally finite collections $\mathcal{U}_n$. Then let $U_n = \cup \mathcal{U}_n$, and then, for each $n$ and $U \in \mathcal{U}_n$, let

$$C(n, U) = U - \cup_{k < n} U_k.$$

Then $\mathcal{C} := \{ C(n, U) \mid n, U \}$ is a locally-closed cover; indeed, if $n$ is the least integer such $x \in U_n$, then $x$ is in some $U \in \mathcal{U}_n$ and $x \not\in U_k, k < n$. For "locally finite", let $x$ be in $X$; say, $x \in C(n, U)$ for some $n, U$. Since each $\mathcal{U}_k$ is locally finite, there is a neighborhood $V$ of $x$ such that $V$ intersects only finitely many sets in $\cup_{k \le n} \mathcal{U}_k$. Then $U \cap V$ intersects only finitely many sets in $\mathcal{C}$, since $U$ is disjoint from the sets $C(k, W), k > n$. The "also" part is proved in essentially the same way; namely, given $\mathcal V = \cup_0^{\infty} \mathcal{V}_n$ and $V_n = \cup \mathcal{V}_n$, let

$$D(n, V) = \overline{V} - \cup_{k < n} V_k.$$

Then $\{ D(n, V) \mid n, V \}$ is a required refinement. $\square$

=== Proof of Proposition ===
Let X be a T_{1}-space in which each open cover admits a closure-preserving closed refinement.

We first note that the assumption on open covers can be strengthen to the following

(*) For each open cover $U_i, i \in I$, there exists a closure-preserving closed cover $F_i, i \in I$ indexed by the same $I$ such that $F_i \subset U_i.$

Indeed, given such an open cover $U_i$, by assumption, we have a closure-preserving closed refinement $\mathcal{F}$ of it. For each $i \in I$, let

$$G_i = \bigcup \{ F \in \mathcal{F} \mid F \subset U_i \}.$$

Then this cover $G_i$ has required properties.

Second, we shall note that $X$ is normal. Indeed, given disjoint closed subsets $F, G$, the open cover $\{ X - F, X - G \}$ has a closed refinement $\{ X - U, X - V \}$; say, $X - U \subset X - F$ and then $U, V$ are disjoint neighborhoods of $F, G$. In particular, $X$ is Hausdorff since $X$ is T_{1}.

We shall now verify the hypothesis of Lemma 1. Let $U_a, a \in A$ be an open cover indexed by a well-ordered set $A$. First, we shall recurviely construct a closure-preserving closed cover $F_{a, n}$ as follows. For $n = 1$, let $F_{a, 1} \subset U_a$ be a closed cover given by (*). Assuming we have constructed $F_{a, n - 1}$, let

$$U_{a, n} = U_a - \cup_{b < a} F_{b, n - 1}.$$

It is an open cover: if $a$ is the least element with the property $x \in F_{a, {n-1}} \subset U_a$, then $x \not\in F_{b, n - 1}, b < a$ and so $x \in U_{a, n}$. By (*), let $F_{a, n} \subset U_{a, n}$ be a closure-preserving closed cover.

Now, since $X = F_{a, n} \cup (\cup_{b \ne a} F_{b. n})$, we have:

$$V_{a, n} := X - (\cup_{b \ne a} F_{b, n}) \subset F_{a, n},$$

which is open since $\{ F_{a, n} \mid a, n \}$ is closure-preserving. We claim $\{ V_{a, n} \mid a, n \}$ is an open cover. Let $x \in X$ and for each $n$, let $a_n$ be the least element such that $x \in F_{a_n, n}$. We have $a_1 \ge a_2 \ge \cdots$ since $F_{a, n} \cap F_{b, n - 1} = \emptyset, b < a$. Since $A$ is well-ordered, the sequence $a_n$ cannot be strictly decreasing all the way; i.e., $a_{n - 1} = a_n$ for some $n$ and then similarly we see $x \not\in F_{b, n}, b \ne a_n.$ That is, $x$ is in $V_{a_n, n}$. Note also $V_{a, n} \cap V_{b, n} = \emptyset, b \ne a.$

Finally, by (*), we can find a closure-preserving closed refinement $D_{a, n} \subset V_{a, n}$. By normality, we then find open sets $W_{a, n}$ such that

$$D_{a, n} \subset W_{a, n} \subset \overline{W_{a, n}} \subset V_{a, n}.$$

For each $n$, let $U_n$ be the union of all open sets, each of which intersects only finitely many sets in $\{ W_{a, n} \mid a \}$. It is a neighborhood of $D_n := \cup_a D_{a, n}$ since $\{ W_{a, n} \mid a \}$ is a disjoint collection. By normality, we have neighborhoods $U'_n$ of $D_n$ with closures lying in $U_n$. Then let

$$W_{a, n}' = W_{a, n} \cap U_n'.$$

Then $\{ W_{a, n}' \mid a \}$ is locally finite. Thus, by Lemma 2, we find a locally finite locally-closed refinement $\mathcal{C}$ of $\{ W_{a, n}' \mid a, n \}.$ Then, since passing to closure doesn’t spoil “locally finite", $\{ \overline{C} \mid C \in \mathcal{C} \}$ is a refinement satisfying the hypothesis of Lemma 1. (The argument after "finally" except Lemma 2 is essentially due to Dowkey.) $\square$

== Similar result ==
There is a similar result due to A. H. Stone (which was actually used to prove a metric space is paracompact).

Proposition—Let X be a T_{1}-space. Then each open cover admits a barycentric open refinement (defined below) if and only if X is paracompact.

Given a set $X$ and a cover $\mathcal{C}$ of it, for each element $x \in X$, we write

$$\operatorname{St}(x, \mathcal{C}) = \bigcup \{ C \in \mathcal{C} \mid x \in C \},$$

and call it the star over $x$ with respect to $\mathcal C$. A collection $\mathcal D$ of subsets of $X$ is then called a barycentric refinement of $\mathcal C$ if $\{ \operatorname{St}(x, \mathcal{D}) \mid x \in X \}$ is a refinement of $\mathcal C$. A barycentric refinement is in particular a refinement.

Lemma 1 is then strengthened to

- If each open cover has a locally finite closed refinement, then each open cover has a locally finite barycentric open refinement.

The proof of the other direction of the theorem uses the following idea: construct a sequence of successive barycentric refinements

$$\mathcal{U}_0 \succ \mathcal{U}_1 \succ \mathcal{U}_2 \succ \cdots$$

where $\mathcal{U}_0 := \mathcal{U}$ is the given open cover $\mathcal{U}$ and we wrote $\prec$ for a barycentric refinement. Very roughly, this puts us in a setup similar to the metric-space one discussed at § Examples and we finish the proof similarly (the actual details are more involved).
