= Small set =

In mathematics, the term small set may refer to:

- Small set (category theory)
- Small set (combinatorics), a set of positive integers whose sum of reciprocals converges
- Small set, an element of a Grothendieck universe

== See also ==
- Ideal on a set
- Natural density
- Large set (disambiguation)
