= Family of sets =

Any collection of sets, or subsets of a set

In set theory and related branches of mathematics, family or collection is used to mean set, indexed set, multiset, tuple, or class. It is usually used in phrases like "family of sets" because if one instead uses "set of sets" then the subsequent use of "set" can be confusing as to whether it is the containing set or one of the member sets. A common use is "family of subsets of some set S". A family of sets is also called a set family or a set system. A finite family of subsets of a finite set $S$ is also called a hypergraph. The subject of extremal set theory concerns the largest and smallest examples of families of sets satisfying certain restrictions.

== Examples ==
The collection of all subsets of a given set $S$ is called the power set of $S$ and is denoted by $\wp(S)$. The power set $\wp(S)$ of a given set $S$ is a family of sets over $S$.

A subset of $S$ having $k$ elements is called a $k$-subset of $S$. The $k$-subsets $S^{(k)}$ of a set $S$ form a family of sets.

Let $S = \{a, b, c, 1, 2\}$. An example of a family of sets over $S$ (in the multiset sense) is given by $F = \left\{A_1, A_2, A_3, A_4\right\}$, where $A_1 = \{a, b, c\}, A_2 = \{1, 2\}, A_3 = \{1, 2\}$, and $A_4 = \{a, b, 1\}$.

The class $\operatorname{Ord}$ of all ordinal numbers is a large family of sets. That is, it is not itself a set but instead a proper class.

== Properties ==
Any family of subsets of a set $S$ is itself a subset of the power set $\wp(S)$ if it has no repeated members.

Any family of sets without repetitions is a subclass of the proper class of all sets (the universe).

Hall's marriage theorem, due to Philip Hall, gives necessary and sufficient conditions for a finite family of non-empty sets (repetitions allowed) to have a system of distinct representatives.

If $\mathcal{F}$ is any family of sets then $\cup \mathcal{F} := {\textstyle \bigcup\limits_{F \in \mathcal{F}}} F$ denotes the union of all sets in $\mathcal F$, where in particular, $\cup \varnothing = \varnothing$. Any family $\mathcal{F}$ of sets is a family over $\cup \mathcal{F}$ and also a family over any superset of $\cup \mathcal F$.

The trace of a family $\mathcal{F}$ of subsets of $S$ on a subset $T \subseteq S$ is $\{A \cap T, A \in \mathcal{F}\}$.

== Related concepts ==
Certain types of objects from other areas of mathematics are equivalent to families of sets, in that they can be described purely as a collection of sets of objects of some type:

- A hypergraph, also called a set system, is formed by a set of vertices together with another set of hyperedges, each of which may be an arbitrary set. The hyperedges of a hypergraph form a family of sets, and any family of sets can be interpreted as a hypergraph that has the union of the sets as its vertices.
- An abstract simplicial complex is a combinatorial abstraction of the notion of a simplicial complex, a shape formed by unions of line segments, triangles, tetrahedra, and higher-dimensional simplices, joined face to face. In an abstract simplicial complex, each simplex is represented simply as the set of its vertices. Any family of finite sets without repetitions in which the subsets of any set in the family also belong to the family forms an abstract simplicial complex.
- An incidence structure consists of a set of points, a set of lines, and an (arbitrary) binary relation, called the incidence relation, specifying which points belong to which lines. An incidence structure can be specified by a family of sets (even if two distinct lines contain the same set of points), the sets of points belonging to each line, and any family of sets can be interpreted as an incidence structure in this way.
- A binary block code consists of a set of codewords, each of which is a string of 0s and 1s, all the same length. When each pair of codewords has large Hamming distance, it can be used as an error-correcting code. A block code can also be described as a family of sets, by describing each codeword as the set of positions at which it contains a 1.
- A topological space consists of a pair $(X, \tau)$ where $X$ is a set (whose elements are called points) and $\tau$ is a topology on $X$, which is a family of sets (whose elements are called open sets) over $X$ that contains both the empty set $\varnothing$ and $X$ itself, and is closed under arbitrary set unions and finite set intersections.

=== Covers and topologies ===
A family of sets is said to cover a set $X$ if every point of $X$ belongs to some member of the family. A subfamily of a cover of $X$ that is also a cover of $X$ is called a subcover. A family is called a point-finite collection if every point of $X$ lies in only finitely many members of the family. If every point of a cover lies in exactly one member of $X$, the cover is a partition of $X$.

When $X$ is a topological space, a cover whose members are all open sets is called an open cover. A family is called locally finite if each point in the space has a neighborhood that intersects only finitely many members of the family. A σ-locally finite or countably locally finite collection is a family that is the union of countably many locally finite families.

A cover $\mathcal{F}$ is said to refine another (coarser) cover $\mathcal{C}$ if every member of $\mathcal{F}$ is contained in some member of $\mathcal C$. A star refinement is a particular type of refinement.

== Special types of set families ==
A Sperner family is a set family in which none of the sets contains any of the others. Sperner's theorem bounds the maximum size of a Sperner family.

A Helly family is a set family such that any minimal subfamily with empty intersection has bounded size. Helly's theorem states that convex sets in Euclidean spaces of bounded dimension form Helly families.

An abstract simplicial complex is a set family $F$ (consisting of finite sets) that is downward closed; that is, every subset of a set in $F$ is also in $F$. A matroid is an abstract simplicial complex with an additional property called the augmentation property.

Every filter is a family of sets.

A convexity space is a set family closed under arbitrary intersections and unions of chains (with respect to the inclusion relation).

Other examples of set families are independence systems, greedoids, antimatroids, and bornological spaces.

Families $\mathcal{F}$ of sets over $\Omega$
Is necessarily true of $\mathcal{F}\colon$ or, is $\mathcal{F}$ closed under:	Directed by $\,\supseteq$	$A \cap B$	$A \cup B$	$B \setminus A$	$\Omega \setminus A$	$A_1 \cap A_2 \cap \cdots$	$A_1 \cup A_2 \cup \cdots$	$\Omega \in \mathcal{F}$	$\varnothing \in \mathcal{F}$	F.I.P.
π-system	Yes	Yes	No	No	No	No	No	No	No	No
Semiring	Yes	Yes	No	No	No	No	No	No	Yes	Never
Semialgebra (semifield)	Yes	Yes	No	No	No	No	No	No	Yes	Never
Monotone class	No	No	No	No	No	only if $A_i \searrow$	only if $A_i \nearrow$	No	No	No
𝜆-system (Dynkin system)	Yes	No	No	only if $A \subseteq B$	Yes	No	only if $A_i \nearrow$ or they are disjoint	Yes	Yes	Never
Ring (order theory)	Yes	Yes	Yes	No	No	No	No	No	No	No
Ring (measure theory)	Yes	Yes	Yes	Yes	No	No	No	No	Yes	Never
δ-ring	Yes	Yes	Yes	Yes	No	Yes	No	No	Yes	Never
𝜎-ring	Yes	Yes	Yes	Yes	No	Yes	Yes	No	Yes	Never
Algebra (field)	Yes	Yes	Yes	Yes	Yes	No	No	Yes	Yes	Never
𝜎-algebra (𝜎-field)	Yes	Yes	Yes	Yes	Yes	Yes	Yes	Yes	Yes	Never
Filter	Yes	Yes	Yes	No	No	No	Yes	Yes	No	No
Proper filter	Yes	Yes	Yes	Never	Never	No	Yes	Yes	Never	Yes
Prefilter (filter base)	Yes	No	No	No	No	No	No	No	No	Yes
Filter subbase	No	No	No	No	No	No	No	No	No	Yes
Open topology	Yes	Yes	Yes	No	No	No	(even arbitrary $\cup$)	Yes	Yes	Never
Closed topology	Yes	Yes	Yes	No	No	(even arbitrary $\cap$)	No	Yes	Yes	Never
Is necessarily true of $\mathcal{F}\colon$ or, is $\mathcal{F}$ closed under:	directed downward	finite intersections	finite unions	relative complements	complements in $\Omega$	countable intersections	countable unions	contains $\Omega$	contains $\varnothing$	Finite intersection property
Additionally, a semiring is a π-system where every complement $B \setminus A$ is equal to a finite disjoint union of sets in $\mathcal{F}.$ A semialgebra is a semiring where every complement $\Omega \setminus A$ is equal to a finite disjoint union of sets in $\mathcal{F}.$ $A, B, A_1, A_2, \ldots$ are arbitrary elements of $\mathcal{F}$ and it is assumed that $\mathcal{F} \neq \varnothing.$

== See also ==
- Algebra of sets – Identities and relationships involving sets
- Class (set theory) – Collection of sets in mathematics that can be defined based on a property of its members
- Combinatorial design – Symmetric arrangement of finite sets
- δ-ring – Ring closed under countable intersections
- Field of sets – Algebraic concept in measure theory, also referred to as an algebra of sets
- Generalized quantifier – Expression denoting a set of sets in formal semantics
- Indexed family – Collection of objects, associated with an index set
- λ-system (Dynkin system) – Family closed under complements and countable disjoint unions
- π-system – Family of sets closed under intersection
- Ring of sets – Family closed under unions and relative complements
- Russell's paradox – Paradox in set theory (or Set of sets that do not contain themselves)
- σ-algebra – Algebraic structure of set algebra
- σ-ring – Family of sets closed under countable unions
