= Locally finite collection =

Topological concept

A collection of subsets of a topological space $X$ is said to be locally finite if each point in the space has a neighbourhood that intersects only finitely many of the sets in the collection.

In the mathematical field of topology, local finiteness is a property of collections of subsets of a topological space. It is fundamental in the study of paracompactness and topological dimension.

Note that the term locally finite has different meanings in other mathematical fields.

== Examples and properties ==
A finite collection of subsets of a topological space is locally finite. Infinite collections can also be locally finite: for example, the collection of subsets of $\mathbb{R}$ of the form $(n, n+2)$ for an integer $n$. A countable collection of subsets need not be locally finite, as shown by the collection of all subsets of $\mathbb{R}$ of the form $(-n, n)$ for a natural number n.

Every locally finite collection of sets is point finite, meaning that every point of the space belongs to only finitely many sets in the collection. Point finiteness is a strictly weaker notion, as illustrated by the collection of intervals $(0,1/n)$ in $\mathbb R$, which is point finite, but not locally finite at the point $0$. The two concepts are used in the definitions of paracompact space and metacompact space, and this is the reason why every paracompact space is metacompact.

If a collection of sets is locally finite, the collection of the closures of these sets is also locally finite. The reason for this is that if an open set containing a point intersects the closure of a set, it necessarily intersects the set itself, hence a neighborhood can intersect at most the same number of closures (it may intersect fewer, since two distinct, indeed disjoint, sets can have the same closure). The converse, however, can fail if the closures of the sets are not distinct. For example, in the finite complement topology on $\mathbb{R}$ the collection of all open sets is not locally finite, but the collection of all closures of these sets is locally finite (since the only closures are $\mathbb{R}$ and the empty set).

An arbitrary union of closed sets is not closed in general. However, the union of a locally finite collection of closed sets is closed. To see this we note that if $x$ is a point outside the union of this locally finite collection of closed sets, we merely choose a neighbourhood $V$ of $x$ that intersects this collection at only finitely many of these sets. Define a bijective map from the collection of sets that $V$ intersects to ${1,\dots,k}$ thus giving an index to each of these sets. Then for each set, choose an open set $U_i$ containing $x$ that doesn't intersect it. The intersection of all such $U_i$ for $1\leq i\leq k$ intersected with $V$, is a neighbourhood of $x$ that does not intersect the union of this collection of closed sets.

=== In compact spaces ===
Every locally finite collection of sets in a compact space is finite. Indeed, let $G=\{G_{a}|a\in A\}$ be a locally finite family of subsets of a compact space $X$ . For each point $x\in X$, choose an open neighbourhood $U_{x}$ that intersects a finite number of the subsets in $G$. Clearly the family of sets: $\{U_{x}|x\in X\}$ is an open cover of $X$, and therefore has a finite subcover: $\{U_{k_n}|n\in 1\dots n\}$. Since each $U_{k_i}$ intersects only a finite number of subsets in $G$, the union of all such $U_{k_i}$ intersects only a finite number of subsets in $G$. Since this union is the whole space $X$, it follows that $X$ intersects only a finite number of subsets in the collection $G$. And since $G$ is composed of subsets of $X$ every member of $G$ must intersect $X$, thus $G$ is finite.

=== In Lindelöf spaces ===
Every locally finite collection of sets in a Lindelöf space, in particular in a second-countable space, is countable. This is proved by a similar argument as in the result above for compact spaces.

== Countably locally finite collections ==
A collection of subsets of a topological space is called σ-locally finite or countably locally finite if it is a countable union of locally finite collections.

The σ-locally finite notion is a key ingredient in the Nagata–Smirnov metrization theorem, which states that a topological space is metrizable if and only if it is regular, Hausdorff, and has a σ-locally finite base.

In a Lindelöf space, in particular in a second-countable space, every σ-locally finite collection of sets is countable.
