= Limit point compact =

Type of topological space in mathematics

In mathematics, a topological space $X$ is said to be limit point compact or weakly countably compact if every infinite subset of $X$ has a limit point in $X.$ This property generalizes a property of compact spaces. In a metric space, limit point compactness, compactness, and sequential compactness are all equivalent. For general topological spaces, however, these three notions of compactness are not equivalent.

== Properties and examples ==
- In a topological space, subsets without limit point are exactly those that are closed and discrete in the subspace topology. So a space is limit point compact if and only if all its closed discrete subsets are finite.
- A space $X$ is not limit point compact if and only if it has an infinite closed discrete subspace. Since any subset of a closed discrete subset of $X$ is itself closed in $X$ and discrete, this is equivalent to require that $X$ has a countably infinite closed discrete subspace.
- Some examples of spaces that are not limit point compact: (1) The set $\Reals$ of all real numbers with its usual topology, since the integers are an infinite set but do not have a limit point in $\Reals$; (2) an infinite set with the discrete topology; (3) the countable complement topology on an uncountable set.
- Every countably compact space (and hence every compact space) is limit point compact.
- For T_{1} spaces, limit point compactness is equivalent to countable compactness.
- An example of limit point compact space that is not countably compact is obtained by "doubling the integers", namely, taking the product $X = \Z \times Y$ where $\Z$ is the set of all integers with the discrete topology and $Y = \{0,1\}$ has the indiscrete topology. The space $X$ is homeomorphic to the odd-even topology. This space is not T_{0}. It is limit point compact because every nonempty subset has a limit point.
- An example of T_{0} space that is limit point compact and not countably compact is $X = \Reals,$ the set of all real numbers, with the right order topology, i.e., the topology generated by all intervals $(x, \infty).$ The space is limit point compact because given any point $a \in X,$ every $x<a$ is a limit point of $\{a\}.$
- For metrizable spaces, compactness, countable compactness, limit point compactness, and sequential compactness are all equivalent.
- Closed subspaces of a limit point compact space are limit point compact.
- The continuous image of a limit point compact space need not be limit point compact. For example, if $X = \Z \times Y$ with $\Z$ discrete and $Y$ indiscrete as in the example above, the map $f = \pi_{\Z}$ given by projection onto the first coordinate is continuous, but $f(X) = \Z$ is not limit point compact.
- A limit point compact space need not be pseudocompact. An example is given by the same $X = \Z \times Y$ with $Y$ indiscrete two-point space and the map $f = \pi_{\Z},$ whose image is not bounded in $\Reals.$
- A limit point compact space need not be compact. The integers with the topology having the basis $\mathcal{B} = \{ \{2n, 2n+1\} : n \in \mathbb{Z} \}$ serve as an example of this fact.
- A pseudocompact space need not be limit point compact. An example is given by an uncountable set with the cocountable topology.
- Every normal pseudocompact space is limit point compact.
  Proof: Suppose $X$ is a normal space that is not limit point compact. There exists a countably infinite closed discrete subset $A = \{x_1, x_2, x_3, \ldots\}$ of $X.$ By the Tietze extension theorem the continuous function $f$ on $A$ defined by $f(x_n) = n$ can be extended to an (unbounded) real-valued continuous function on all of $X.$ So $X$ is not pseudocompact.
- Limit point compact spaces have countable extent.
- If $(X, \tau)$ and $(X, \sigma)$ are topological spaces with $\sigma$ finer than $\tau$ and $(X, \sigma)$ is limit point compact, then so is $(X, \tau).$

== See also ==
- Compact space – Type of mathematical space
- Countably compact space
- Sequentially compact space – Topological space where every sequence has a convergent subsequence
