= Radó's theorem (Riemann surfaces) =

Theorem in complex analysis

In mathematical complex analysis, Radó's theorem, proved by Tibor Radó (1925), states that every connected Riemann surface is second-countable (has a countable base for its topology).

The Prüfer surface is an example of a surface with no countable base for the topology, so cannot have the structure of a Riemann surface.

The obvious analogue of Radó's theorem in higher dimensions is false: there are 2-dimensional connected complex manifolds that are not second-countable.
