= Star refinement =

In mathematics, specifically in the study of topology and open covers of a topological space X, a star refinement is a particular kind of refinement of an open cover of X. The term has two similar but distinct usages. A related term sometimes used to differentiate the weaker of these two properties is the notion of a barycentric refinement.

Star refinements are used in the definition of a fully normal space, and in one among several equivalent formulations of a uniform space.

== Definitions ==
The general definition makes sense for arbitrary coverings and does not require a topology. Let $X$ be a set and let $\mathcal U$ be a covering of $X,$ that is, $X = \bigcup \mathcal U.$ Given a subset $S$ of $X,$ the star of $S$ with respect to $\mathcal U$ is the union of all the sets $U \in \mathcal U$ that intersect $S,$ that is,
$$\operatorname{st}(S, \mathcal U) = \bigcup\big\{U \in \mathcal U: S\cap U \neq \varnothing\big\}.$$

Given a point $x \in X,$ we write $\operatorname{st}(x,\mathcal U)$ instead of $\operatorname{st}(\{x\}, \mathcal U).$

A covering $\mathcal U$ of $X$ is a refinement of a covering $\mathcal V$ of $X$ if every $U \in \mathcal U$ is contained in some $V \in \mathcal V.$ The following are two special kinds of refinement. The covering $\mathcal U$ is called a barycentric refinement of $\mathcal V$ if for every $x \in X$ the star $\operatorname{st}(x,\mathcal U)$ is contained in some $V \in \mathcal V.$ The covering $\mathcal U$ is called a star refinement of $\mathcal V$ if for every $U \in \mathcal U$ the star $\operatorname{st}(U, \mathcal U)$ is contained in some $V \in \mathcal V.$

A space $X$ is called fully normal if every open cover of $X$ has a barycentric open refinement.

== Properties and Examples ==
Every star refinement of a cover is a barycentric refinement of that cover. The converse is not true, but a barycentric refinement of a barycentric refinement is a star refinement.

Given a metric space $X,$ let $\mathcal V=\{B_\epsilon(x): x\in X\}$ be the collection of all open balls $B_\epsilon(x)$ of a fixed radius $\epsilon>0.$ The collection $\mathcal U=\{B_{\epsilon/2}(x): x\in X\}$ is a barycentric refinement of $\mathcal V,$ and the collection $\mathcal W=\{B_{\epsilon/3}(x): x\in X\}$ is a star refinement of $\mathcal V.$

By a theorem of A.H. Stone, for a T_{1} space being fully normal and being paracompact are equivalent. This was a landmark theorem and provided the first proof that metric spaces are paracompact. The proof is difficult, but simpler proofs of the paracompactness of metric spaces were later provided.

== See also ==
- Family of sets – Any collection of sets, or subsets of a set
