= Moore space =

In mathematics, Moore space may refer to:

- Moore space (algebraic topology)
- Moore space (topology), a regular, developable topological space.
