= Moore plane =

Topological space

In mathematics, the Moore plane, also sometimes called Niemytzki plane (or Nemytskii plane, Nemytskii's tangent disk topology), is a topological space. It is a completely regular Hausdorff space (that is, a Tychonoff space) that is not normal. It is an example of a Moore space that is not metrizable. It is named after Robert Lee Moore and Viktor Vladimirovich Nemytskii.

== Definition ==
Open neighborhood of the Niemytzki plane, tangent to the x-axis

If $\Gamma$ is the (closed) upper half-plane $\Gamma = \{(x,y)\in\R^2 | y \geq 0 \}$, then a topology may be defined on $\Gamma$ by taking a local basis $\mathcal{B}(p,q)$ as follows:

- Elements of the local basis at points $(x,y)$ with $y>0$ are the open discs in the plane which are small enough to lie within $\Gamma$.
- Elements of the local basis at points $p = (x,0)$ are sets $\{p\}\cup A$ where A is an open disc in the upper half-plane which is tangent to the x axis at p.

That is, the local basis is given by

$$\mathcal{B}(p,q) = \begin{cases} \{ U_{\epsilon}(p,q):= \{(x,y):  (x-p)^2+(y-q)^2 < \epsilon^2 \} \mid \epsilon > 0\}, & \mbox{if }  q > 0;  \\ \{ V_{\epsilon}(p):= \{(p,0)\} \cup \{(x,y):  (x-p)^2+(y-\epsilon)^2 < \epsilon^2 \} \mid \epsilon > 0\},  & \mbox{if } q = 0. \end{cases}$$

Thus the subspace topology inherited by $\Gamma\backslash \{(x,0) | x \in \R\}$ is the same as the subspace topology inherited from the standard topology of the Euclidean plane.

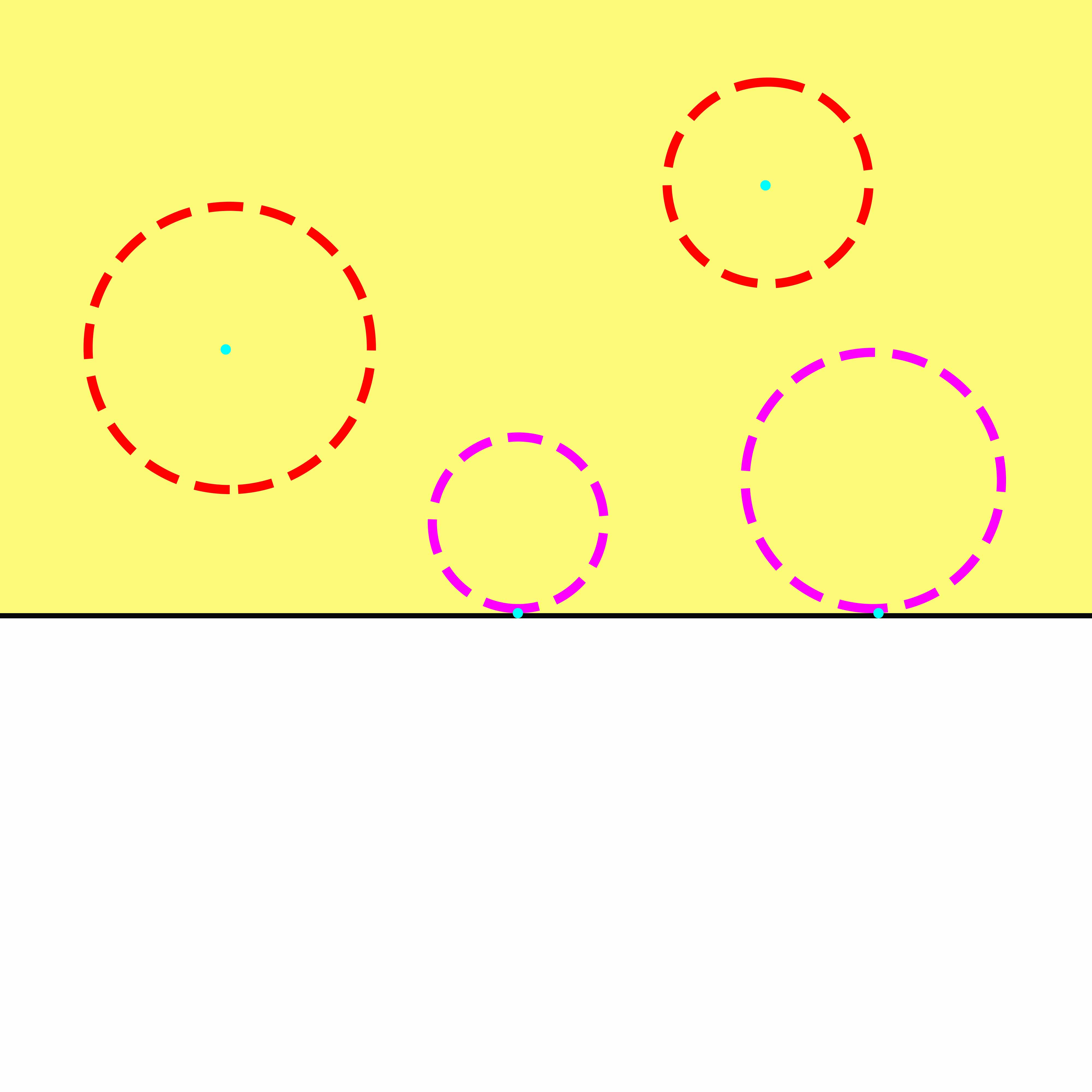
Moore Plane graphic representation

== Properties ==
- The Moore plane $\Gamma$ is separable, that is, it has a countable dense subset.
- The Moore plane is a completely regular Hausdorff space (i.e. Tychonoff space), which is not normal.
- The subspace $\{(x,0)\in \Gamma | x\in R \}$ of $\Gamma$ has, as its subspace topology, the discrete topology. Thus, the Moore plane shows that a subspace of a separable space need not be separable.
- The Moore plane is first countable, but not second countable or Lindelöf.
- The Moore plane is not locally compact.
- The Moore plane is countably metacompact but not metacompact.

== Proof that the Moore plane is not normal ==
The fact that this space $\Gamma$ is not normal can be established by the following counting argument (which is very similar to the argument that the Sorgenfrey plane is not normal):

1. On the one hand, the countable set $S:=\{(p,q) \in \mathbb Q\times \mathbb Q: q>0\}$ of points with rational coordinates is dense in $\Gamma$; hence every continuous function $f:\Gamma \to \mathbb R$ is determined by its restriction to $S$, so there can be at most $|\mathbb R|^{|S|} = 2^{\aleph_0}$ many continuous real-valued functions on $\Gamma$.
2. On the other hand, the real line $L:=\{(p,0): p\in \mathbb R\}$ is a closed discrete subspace of $\Gamma$ with $2^{\aleph_0}$ many points. So there are $2^{2^{\aleph_0}} > 2^{\aleph_0}$ many continuous functions from L to $\mathbb R$. Not all these functions can be extended to continuous functions on $\Gamma$.
3. Hence $\Gamma$ is not normal, because by the Tietze extension theorem all continuous functions defined on a closed subspace of a normal space can be extended to a continuous function on the whole space.

In fact, if X is a separable topological space having an uncountable closed discrete subspace, X cannot be normal.

== See also ==
- Hedgehog space
