= Lower limit topology =

Topology on the real numbers

In mathematics, the lower limit topology or right half-open interval topology is a topology defined on $\mathbb{R}$, the set of real numbers; it is different from the standard topology on $\mathbb{R}$ (generated by the open intervals) and has a number of interesting properties. It is the topology generated by the basis of all half-open intervals [a,b), where a and b are real numbers.

The resulting topological space is called the Sorgenfrey line after Robert Sorgenfrey or the arrow and is sometimes written $\mathbb{R}_l$, $\mathbb{R}_{\text{LL}}$ or $\mathbb{R}_{\text{bad}}$. Like the Cantor set and the long line, the Sorgenfrey line often serves as a useful counterexample to many otherwise plausible-sounding conjectures in general topology. The product of $\mathbb{R}_l$ with itself is also a useful counterexample, known as the Sorgenfrey plane.

In complete analogy, one can also define the upper limit topology, or left half-open interval topology.

== Properties ==
- The lower limit topology is finer (has more open sets) than the standard topology on the real numbers (which is generated by the open intervals). The reason is that every open interval can be written as a (countably infinite) union of half-open intervals.
- For any real $a$ and $b$, the interval $[a,b)$ is clopen in $\mathbb{R}_l$ (i.e., both open and closed). Furthermore, for all real $a$, the sets $\{x\in\mathbb{R} : x < a\}$ and $\{x \in\mathbb{R} : x \geq a\}$ are also clopen. This shows that the Sorgenfrey line is totally disconnected.
- Any compact subset of $\mathbb{R}_l$ must be an at most countable set. To see this, consider a non-empty compact subset $C\subseteq\mathbb{R}_l$. Fix an $x \in C$, consider the following open cover of $C$:
  $$\bigl\{ [x, +\infty) \bigr\} \cup \Bigl\{ \bigl(-\infty, x - \tfrac{1}{n} \bigr) \,\Big|\, n \in \mathbb{N} \Bigr\}.$$
  Since $C$ is compact, this cover has a finite subcover, and hence there exists a real number $a(x)$ such that the interval $(a(x), x]$ contains no point of $C$ apart from $x$. This is true for all $x\in C$. Now choose a rational number $q(x) \in (a(x), x]\cap\mathbb{Q}$. Since the intervals $(a(x), x]$, parametrized by $x \in C$, are pairwise disjoint, the function $q: C \to \mathbb{Q}$ is injective, and so $C$ is at most countable.
- The name "lower limit topology" comes from the following fact: a sequence (or net) $(x_\alpha)$ in $\mathbb{R}_l$ converges to the limit $L$ if and only if it "approaches $L$ from the right", meaning for every $\epsilon>0$ there exists an index $\alpha_0$ such that $\forall\alpha \geq \alpha_0 : L \leq x_\alpha < L+\epsilon$. The Sorgenfrey line can thus be used to study right-sided limits: if $f: \mathbb{R} \to \mathbb{R}$ is a function, then the ordinary right-sided limit of $f$ at $x$ (when the codomain carries the standard topology) is the same as the usual limit of $f$ at $x$ when the domain is equipped with the lower limit topology and the codomain carries the standard topology.
- In terms of separation axioms, $\mathbb{R}_l$ is a perfectly normal Hausdorff space.
- In terms of countability axioms, $\mathbb{R}_l$ is first-countable and separable, but not second-countable.
- In terms of compactness properties, $\mathbb{R}_l$ is Lindelöf and paracompact, but not σ-compact nor locally compact.
- $\mathbb{R}_l$ is not metrizable, since separable metric spaces are second-countable. However, the topology of a Sorgenfrey line is generated by a quasimetric.
- $\mathbb{R}_l$ is a Baire space.
- $\mathbb{R}_l$ does not have any connected compactifications.

== See also ==
- List of topologies
