= Cocountability =

Property of mathematical sets

In mathematics, a cocountable subset of a set $X$ is a subset $Y$ whose complement in $X$ is a countable set. In other words, $Y$ contains all but countably many elements of $X$. Since the rational numbers are a countable subset of the reals, for example, the irrational numbers are a cocountable subset of the reals. If the complement is finite, then one says $Y$ is cofinite.

== σ-algebras ==
The set of all subsets of $X$ that are either countable or cocountable forms a σ-algebra, i.e., it is closed under the operations of countable unions, countable intersections, and complementation. This σ-algebra is the countable-cocountable algebra on $X$. It is the smallest σ-algebra containing every singleton set.

== Topology ==
The cocountable topology (also called the "countable complement topology") on any set $X$ consists of the empty set and all cocountable subsets of $X$.
