= Radó's theorem (harmonic functions) =

In mathematics, Radó's theorem is a result about harmonic functions, named after Tibor Radó. Informally, it says that any "nice looking" shape without holes can be smoothly deformed into a disk.

Suppose Ω is an open, connected and convex subset of the Euclidean space R^{2} with smooth boundary ∂Ω and suppose that D is the unit disk. Then, given any homeomorphism μ : ∂D → ∂Ω, there exists a unique harmonic function u : D → Ω such that u = μ on ∂D and u is a diffeomorphism.
