= Finite topology =

Finite topology is a mathematical concept which has several different meanings.

== Finite topological space ==
A finite topological space is a topological space, the underlying set of which is finite.

== In endomorphism rings and modules ==
If A and B are abelian groups then the finite topology on the group of homomorphisms Hom(A, B) can be defined using the following base of open neighbourhoods of zero.

$$U_{x_1,x_2,\ldots,x_n}=\{f\in\operatorname{Hom}(A,B)\mid f(x_i)=0 \mbox{ for } i=1,2,\ldots,n\}$$

This concept finds applications especially in the study of endomorphism rings where we have A = B. Similarly, if R is a ring and M is a right R-module, then the finite topology on $\text{End}_R(M)$ is defined using the following system of neighborhoods of zero:

$$U_X = \{f\in \text{End}_R(M) \mid f(X) = 0\}$$

== In vector spaces ==
In a vector space $V$, the finite open sets $U\subset V$ are defined as those sets whose intersections with all finite-dimensional subspaces $F\subset V$ are open. The finite topology on $V$ is defined by these open sets and is sometimes denoted $\tau_f(V)$.

When V has uncountable dimension, this topology is not locally convex nor does it make V as topological vector space, but when V has countable dimension it coincides with both the finest vector space topology on V and the finest locally convex topology on V.

== In manifolds ==
A manifold M is sometimes said to have finite topology, or finite topological type, if it is homeomorphic to a compact Riemann surface from which a finite number of points have been removed.
