= Prüfer manifold =

2-d Hausdorff real analytic manifold that is not paracompact

In topology, the Prüfer manifold or Prüfer surface is a 2-dimensional Hausdorff real analytic manifold that is not paracompact. It was introduced by Tibor Radó in 1925 and named after Heinz Prüfer.

== Construction ==
The Prüfer manifold can be constructed as follows: take an uncountable number of copies $(X_a)_{a\in\R}$ of the plane, and take a copy $H$ of the upper half-plane. Then glue the open upper half of each plane $X_a$ to the upper half plane $H$ by identifying $(x,y)\in X_a$ for $y>0$ with the point $(a+yx,y)$ in $H$. The resulting quotient space $Q$ is the Prüfer manifold. The images in $Q$ of the points $(0,0)$ of the spaces $X_a$ under identification form an uncountable discrete subset.

== See also ==
- Long line (topology)
