= Tibor Radó =

Hungarian mathematician (1895–1965)

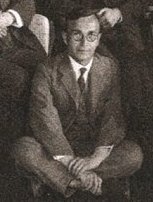
- Born: June 2, 1895; Budapest, Austria-Hungary
- Died: December 29, 1965 (aged 70); New Smyrna Beach, Florida, U.S.
- Education: Franz Joseph University
- Known for: Radó's theorem (Riemann surfaces); Radó's theorem (harmonic functions); Radó–Kneser–Choquet theorem Covering problem of Rado; Busy beaver problem
- Scientific career
- Fields: Mathematics

Tibor Radó (Hungarian: Radó Tibor [ˈrɒdoː ˈtibor]; June 2, 1895 – December 29, 1965) was a Hungarian mathematician who moved to the United States after World War I.

== Biography ==
Radó was born in Budapest in 1895. He later went on to attend the Polytechnic Institute, studying civil engineering. In World War I, he became a First Lieutenant in the Hungarian Army and was captured on the Russian Front. He escaped from a Siberian prisoner camp and, traveling thousands of miles across Arctic wasteland, managed to return to Hungary.

He received a doctorate from the Franz Joseph University in 1923. He taught briefly at the university and then became a research fellow in Germany for the Rockefeller Foundation. In 1929, he moved to the United States and lectured at Harvard University and the Rice Institute before obtaining a faculty position in the Department of Mathematics at Ohio State University in 1930. In 1935 he was granted American citizenship. In World War II he was a science consultant to the United States government, interrupting his academic career. He became Chairman of the Department of Mathematics at Ohio State University in 1948.

In the 1920s, he proved that surfaces have an essentially unique triangulation. In 1933, Radó published "On the Problem of Plateau" in which he gave a solution to Plateau's problem, and in 1935, "Subharmonic Functions". His work focused on computer science in the last decade of his life and in May 1962 he published one of his most famous results in the Bell System Technical Journal: the busy beaver function and its non-computability ("On Non-Computable Functions").

He died in New Smyrna Beach, Florida.

== Works ==
- Über den Begriff der Riemannschen Fläche, Acta Scientarum Mathematicarum Universitatis Szegediensis, 1925
- The problem of least area and the problem of Plateau, Mathematische Zeitschrift Vol. 32, 1930, p.763
- On the problem of Plateau, Springer-Verlag, Berlin, Ergebnisse der Mathematik und ihrer Grenzgebiete, 1933, 1951, 1971
- Subharmonic Functions, Springer, Ergebnisse der Mathematik und ihrer Grenzgebiete, 1937
- Length and Area, AMS Colloquium Lectures, 1948
- with Paul V. Reichelderfer Continuous transformations in analysis - with an introduction to algebraic topology, Springer 1955
- On Non-Computable Functions, Bell System Technical Journal 41/1962 scan
- Computer studies of Turing machine problems, Journal of the ACM 12/1965

== See also ==
- Radó's theorem (Riemann surfaces)
- Radó's theorem (harmonic functions)
