= Cofiniteness =

Subset with finite complement

In mathematics, a cofinite subset of a set $X$ is a subset $A$ whose complement in $X$ is a finite set. In other words, $A$ contains all but finitely many elements of $X.$ If the complement is not finite, but is countable, then one says the set is cocountable.

These arise naturally when generalizing structures on finite sets to infinite sets, particularly on infinite products, as in the product topology or direct sum.

This use of the prefix "co" to describe a property possessed by a set's complement is consistent with its use in other terms such as "comeagre set".

== Boolean algebras ==
The set of all subsets of $X$ that are either finite or cofinite forms a Boolean algebra, which means that it is closed under the operations of union, intersection, and complementation. This Boolean algebra is the finite–cofinite algebra on $X.$

In the other direction, a Boolean algebra $A$ has a unique non-principal ultrafilter (that is, a maximal filter not generated by a single element of the algebra) if and only if there exists an infinite set $X$ such that $A$ is isomorphic to the finite–cofinite algebra on $X.$ In this case, the non-principal ultrafilter is the set of all cofinite subsets of $X$.

== Cofinite topology ==
The cofinite topology or the finite complement topology is a topology that can be defined on every set $X.$ It has precisely the empty set and all cofinite subsets of $X$ as open sets. As a consequence, in the cofinite topology, the only closed subsets are finite sets, or the whole of $X.$ For this reason, the cofinite topology is also known as the finite-closed topology. Symbolically, one writes the topology as
$$\mathcal{T} = \{A \subseteq X : A = \varnothing \mbox{ or } X \setminus A \mbox{ is finite} \}.$$

This topology occurs naturally in the context of the Zariski topology. Since polynomials in one variable over a field $K$ are zero on finite sets, or the whole of $K,$ the Zariski topology on $K$ (considered as affine line) is the cofinite topology. The same is true for any irreducible algebraic curve; it is not true, for example, for $XY = 0$ in the plane.

=== Properties ===
- Subspaces: Every subspace topology of the cofinite topology is also a cofinite topology.
- Compactness: Since every open set contains all but finitely many points of $X,$ the space $X$ is compact and sequentially compact.
- Separation: The cofinite topology is the coarsest topology satisfying the T_{1} axiom; that is, it is the smallest topology for which every singleton set is closed. In fact, an arbitrary topology on $X$ satisfies the T_{1} axiom if and only if it contains the cofinite topology. If $X$ is finite then the cofinite topology is simply the discrete topology. If $X$ is not finite then this topology is not Hausdorff (T_{2}), regular or normal because no two nonempty open sets are disjoint (that is, it is hyperconnected).

=== Double-pointed cofinite topology ===
The double-pointed cofinite topology is the cofinite topology with every point doubled; that is, it is the topological product of the cofinite topology with the indiscrete topology on a two-element set. It is not T_{0} or T_{1}, since the points of each doublet are topologically indistinguishable. It is, however, R_{0} since topologically distinguishable points are separated. The space is compact as the product of two compact spaces; alternatively, it is compact because each nonempty open set contains all but finitely many points.

For an example of the countable double-pointed cofinite topology, the set $\Z$ of integers can be given a topology such that every even number $2n$ is topologically indistinguishable from the following odd number $2n+1$. The closed sets are the unions of finitely many pairs $2n,2n+1,$ or the whole set. The open sets are the complements of the closed sets; namely, each open set consists of all but a finite number of pairs $2n,2n+1,$ or is the empty set.

== Other examples ==
=== Product topology ===
The product topology on a product of topological spaces $\prod X_i$ has basis $\prod U_i$ where $U_i \subseteq X_i$ is open, and cofinitely many $U_i = X_i.$

The analog without requiring that cofinitely many factors are the whole space is the box topology.

=== Direct sum ===
The elements of the direct sum of modules $\bigoplus M_i$ are sequences $\alpha_i \in M_i$ where cofinitely many $\alpha_i = 0.$

The analog without requiring that cofinitely many summands are zero is the direct product.

== See also ==
- Fréchet filter – Collection of all cofinite subsets of given set
- List of topologies – List of concrete topologies and topological spaces
