= Locally finite operator =

In mathematics, a linear operator $f: V\to V$ is called locally finite if the space $V$ is the union of a family of finite-dimensional $f$-invariant subspaces.

In other words, there exists a family $\{ V_i\vert i\in I\}$ of linear subspaces of $V$, such that we have the following:

- $\bigcup_{i\in I} V_i=V$
- $(\forall i\in I) f[V_i]\subseteq V_i$
- Each $V_i$ is finite-dimensional.

An equivalent condition only requires $V$ to be spanned by finite-dimensional $f$-invariant subspaces. If $V$ is also a Hilbert space, sometimes an operator is called locally finite when the sum of the $\{ V_i\vert i\in I\}$ is only dense in $V$.

== Examples ==
- Every linear operator on a finite-dimensional space is trivially locally finite.
- Every diagonalizable (i.e. there exists a basis of $V$ whose elements are all eigenvectors of $f$) linear operator is locally finite, because it is the union of subspaces spanned by finitely many eigenvectors of $f$.
- The operator on $\mathbb{C}[x]$, the space of polynomials with complex coefficients, defined by $T(f(x))=xf(x)$, is not locally finite; any $T$-invariant subspace is of the form $\mathbb{C}[x]f_0(x)$ for some $f_0(x)\in\mathbb{C}[x]$, and so has infinite (or zero) dimension.
- The operator on $\mathbb{C}[x]$ defined by $T(f(x))=\frac{f(x)-f(0)}{x}$ is locally finite; for any $n$, the polynomials of degree at most $n$ form a $T$-invariant subspace.
