= Sorgenfrey plane =

Frequently-cited counterexample in topology

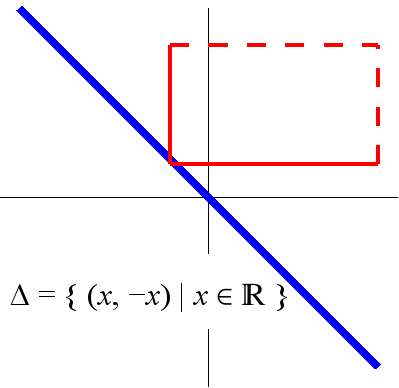
An illustration of the anti-diagonal and an open rectangle in the Sorgenfrey plane that meets the anti-diagonal at a single point.

In topology, the Sorgenfrey plane is a frequently-cited counterexample to many otherwise plausible-sounding conjectures. It consists of the product of two copies of the Sorgenfrey line, which is the real line $\mathbb{R}$ under the half-open interval topology. The Sorgenfrey line and plane are named for the American mathematician Robert Sorgenfrey.

A basis for the Sorgenfrey plane, denoted $\mathbb{S}$ from now on, is therefore the set of rectangles that include the west edge, southwest corner, and south edge, and omit the southeast corner, east edge, northeast corner, north edge, and northwest corner. Open sets in $\mathbb{S}$ are unions of such rectangles.

$\mathbb{S}$ is an example of a space that is a product of Lindelöf spaces that is not itself a Lindelöf space. The so-called anti-diagonal $\Delta = \{(x, -x) \mid x \in \mathbb{R}\}$ is an uncountable discrete subset of this space, and this is a non-separable subset of the separable space $\mathbb{S}$. It shows that separability does not inherit to closed subspaces. Note that $K = \{(x, -x) \mid x \in \mathbb{Q}\}$ and $\Delta \setminus K$ are closed sets; it can be proved that they cannot be separated by open sets, showing that $\mathbb{S}$ is not normal. Thus it serves as a counterexample to the notion that the product of normal spaces is normal; in fact, it shows that even the finite product of perfectly normal spaces need not be normal.

== See also ==
- List of topologies
- Moore plane
