= Small set (category theory) =

Mathematical structure in category theory

In category theory, a small set is one in a fixed universe of sets (as the word universe is used in mathematics in general). Thus, the category of small sets is the category of all sets one cares to consider. This is used when one does not wish to bother with set-theoretic concerns of what is and what is not considered a set, which concerns would arise if one tried to speak of the category of "all sets".

A small set is not to be confused with a small category, which is a category in which the collection of arrows (and therefore also the collection of objects) is a set.

In other choices of foundations, such as Grothendieck universes, there exist both sets that belong to the universe, called “small sets”, and sets that do not, such as the universe itself, “large sets”. We gain an intermediate notion of moderate set: a subset of the universe, which may be small or large. Every small set is moderate, but not conversely.

Since in many cases the choice of foundations is irrelevant, it makes sense to always say “small set” for emphasis even if one has in mind a foundation where all sets are small.

Similarly, a small family is a family indexed by a small set; the axiom of replacement (if it applies in the foundation in question) then says that the image of the family is also small.

== See also ==
- Category of sets
- Class (set theory)
