= Orthocompact space =

Topological space with an interior-preserving refinement for every open cover

In mathematics, in the field of general topology, a topological space is said to be orthocompact if every open cover has an interior-preserving open refinement. That is, given an open cover of the topological space, there is a refinement that is also an open cover, with the further property that at any point, the intersection of all open sets in the refinement containing that point is also open.

If the number of open sets containing the point is finite, then their intersection is definitionally open. That is, every point-finite open cover is interior preserving. Hence, we have the following: every metacompact space, and in particular, every paracompact space, is orthocompact.

Useful theorems:

- Orthocompactness is a topological invariant; that is, it is preserved by homeomorphisms.
- Every closed subspace of an orthocompact space is orthocompact.
- A topological space X is orthocompact if and only if every open cover of X by basic open subsets of X has an interior-preserving refinement that is an open cover of X.
- The product X × [0,1] of the closed unit interval with an orthocompact space X is orthocompact if and only if X is countably metacompact. (B.M. Scott)
- Every orthocompact space is countably orthocompact.
- Every countably orthocompact Lindelöf space is orthocompact.

== See also ==
- Compact space – Type of mathematical space
