= Sequentially compact space =

Topological space where every sequence has a convergent subsequence

In mathematics, a topological space $X$ is sequentially compact if every sequence of points in $X$ has a convergent subsequence converging to a point in $X$.

Every metric space is naturally a topological space, and for metric spaces, the notions of compactness and sequential compactness are equivalent (using the axiom of countable choice). However, there exist sequentially compact topological spaces that are not compact, and compact topological spaces that are not sequentially compact.

== Examples and properties ==
The space of all real numbers with the standard topology is not sequentially compact; the sequence $(s_n)$ given by $s_n = n$ for all natural numbers $n$ is a sequence that has no convergent subsequence.

On a first countable space, a sequence $x_n$ has a convergent subsequence if and only if
$$\bigcap_n \overline{ \{ x_m \mid m \ge n \} }$$
is nonempty. Indeed, a limit of a convergent subsequence is necessarily in the above intersection (this direction holds for any topological space). Conversely, if $x$ is in the above intersection, then let $x \in \cdots \subset U_2 \subset U_1$ be a countable neighborhood base at $x$. Then, inductively, choose integers $n_i > 0$ such that $n_i$ is a least integer with the property (1) $n_i > n_{i-1}$ and (2) $x_{n_i} \in U_i$, which is possible since $\mathbb N$ is a well-ordered set. Then $x_{n_j} \to x$.

A point in the above intersection is called a cluster point. Thus, for first countable spaces, the definition of a sequentially compact space is the same as saying that each sequence in the space has a cluster point.

If a space is a metric space, then it is sequentially compact if and only if it is compact (cf. Heine–Borel theorem § Generalization). Here is how to see this, using only the countable Choice. We have to show "sequentially compact" implies "compact". First, we note $X$ is totally bounded, meaning for each $\epsilon > 0$, there is a finite cover of $X$ consisting of open balls $B(x, \epsilon)$ of radius $\epsilon$. Indeed, if it fails for some $\epsilon$, by countable Choice, choose a sequence $x_n$ such that
$$x_n \not\in B(x_1, \epsilon) \cup \cdots \cup B(x_{n-1}, \epsilon).$$
This sequence $x_n$ has no convergent subsequence, a contradiction. It follows that $X$ has a countable base. Hence, it is enough to show $X$ is countably compact; i.e., each descending sequence $E_1 \supset E_2 \supset \cdots$ of nonempty closed subsets has nonempty intersection. But this is clear since
$$\emptyset \ne \cap_n \overline{\{ x_m \mid m \ge n \}} \subset \cap_n E_n$$
for some sequence $x_n$ with $x_n \in E_n$. $\square$

The first uncountable ordinal with the order topology is an example of a sequentially compact topological space that is not compact. The topological product of $2^{\aleph_0}=\mathfrak c$ copies of the closed unit interval is an example of a compact space that is not sequentially compact.

== Related notions ==
A topological space $X$ is said to be limit point compact if every infinite subset of $X$ has a limit point in $X$, and countably compact if every countable open cover has a finite subcover. In a metric space, the notions of sequential compactness, limit point compactness, countable compactness and compactness are all equivalent (if one assumes the axiom of choice).

In a sequential (Hausdorff) space sequential compactness is equivalent to countable compactness.

There is also a notion of a one-point sequential compactification—the idea is that the non convergent sequences should all converge to the extra point.

== See also ==
- Bolzano–Weierstrass theorem – Bounded sequence in finite-dimensional Euclidean space has a convergent subsequence
- Fréchet–Urysohn space – Type of topological space
- Sequence covering maps
- Sequential space – Topological space characterized by sequences
