= Paracompact space =

Topological space which is a generalization of certain compact spaces

In mathematics, a paracompact space is a topological space in which every open cover has an open refinement that is locally finite. These spaces were introduced by Dieudonné (1944). Every compact space is paracompact. Every paracompact Hausdorff space is normal, and a Hausdorff space is paracompact if and only if it admits partitions of unity subordinate to any open cover. Sometimes paracompact spaces are defined so as to always be Hausdorff.

Every closed subspace of a paracompact space is paracompact. While compact subsets of Hausdorff spaces are always closed, this is not true for paracompact subsets. A space such that every subspace of it is a paracompact space is called hereditarily paracompact. This is equivalent to requiring that every open subspace be paracompact.

The notion of paracompact space is also studied in pointless topology, where it is more well-behaved. For example, the product of any number of paracompact locales is a paracompact locale, but the product of two paracompact spaces may not be paracompact. Compare this to Tychonoff's theorem, which states that the product of any collection of compact topological spaces is compact. However, the product of a paracompact space and a compact space is always paracompact.

Every metric space is paracompact. A topological space is metrizable if and only if it is a paracompact and locally metrizable Hausdorff space.

== Definition ==
A cover of a set $X$ is a collection of subsets of $X$ whose union contains $X$. In symbols, if $U = \{U_\alpha : \alpha \in A\}$ is an indexed family of subsets of $X$, then $U$ is a cover of $X$ if
$$X \subseteq \bigcup_{\alpha \in A}U_{\alpha}.$$

A cover of a topological space $X$ is open if all its members are open sets. A refinement of a cover of a space $X$ is a new cover of the same space such that every set in the new cover is a subset of some set in the old cover. In symbols, the cover $V = \{V_\beta : \beta \in B\}$ is a refinement of the cover $U = \{U_\alpha : \alpha \in A\}$ if and only if, for every $V_\beta$ in $V$, there exists some $U_\alpha$ in $U$ such that $V_\beta \subseteq U_\alpha$.

An open cover of a space $X$ is locally finite if every point of the space has a neighborhood that intersects only finitely many sets in the cover. In symbols, $U = \{U_\alpha : \alpha \in A\}$ is locally finite if and only if, for any $x$ in $X$, there exists some neighbourhood $V$ of $x$ such that the set
$$\left\{ \alpha \in A : U_{\alpha} \cap V \neq \varnothing \right\}$$
is finite. A topological space $X$ is now said to be paracompact if every open cover has a locally finite open refinement.

This definition extends verbatim to locales, with the exception of locally finite: an open cover $U$ of $X$ is locally finite iff the set of opens $V$ that intersect only finitely many opens in $U$ also form a cover of $X$. Note that an open cover on a topological space is locally finite iff its a locally finite cover of the underlying locale.

== Examples ==
- Every compact space is paracompact.
- Every regular Lindelöf space is paracompact, by Michael's theorem in the Hausdorff case. In particular, every locally compact Hausdorff second-countable space is paracompact.
- The Sorgenfrey line is paracompact, even though it is neither compact, locally compact, second countable, nor metrizable.
- Every CW complex is paracompact.
- (Theorem of A. H. Stone) Every metric space is paracompact. Early proofs were somewhat involved, but an elementary one was found by M. E. Rudin. Existing proofs of this require the axiom of choice for the non-separable case. It has been shown that ZF theory is not sufficient to prove it, even after the weaker axiom of dependent choice is added.
- A Hausdorff space admitting an exhaustion by compact sets is paracompact.

Some examples of spaces that are not paracompact include:

- The most famous counterexample is the long line, which is a nonparacompact topological manifold. (The long line is locally compact, but not second countable.)
- Another counterexample is a product of uncountably many copies of an infinite discrete space. Any infinite set carrying the particular point topology is not paracompact; in fact it is not even metacompact.
- The Prüfer manifold P is a non-paracompact surface. (It is easy to find an uncountable open cover of P with no refinement of any kind.)
- The bagpipe theorem shows that there are 2^{ℵ_{1}} topological equivalence classes of non-paracompact surfaces.
- The Sorgenfrey plane is not paracompact despite being a product of two paracompact spaces.

== Properties ==
Paracompactness is weakly hereditary, i.e. every closed subspace of a paracompact space is paracompact. This can be extended to F-sigma subspaces as well.

- (Michael's theorem) A regular space is paracompact if every open cover admits a locally finite refinement, not necessarily open. In particular, every regular Lindelöf space is paracompact.
- (Smirnov metrization theorem) A topological space is metrizable if and only if it is paracompact, Hausdorff, and locally metrizable.
- Michael selection theorem states that lower semicontinuous multifunctions from X into nonempty closed convex subsets of Banach spaces admit continuous selection iff X is paracompact.

Although a product of paracompact spaces need not be paracompact, the following are true:

- The product of a paracompact space and a compact space is paracompact.
- The product of a metacompact space and a compact space is metacompact.

Both these results can be proved by the tube lemma which is used in the proof that a product of finitely many compact spaces is compact.

== Paracompact Hausdorff spaces ==
Paracompact spaces are sometimes required to also be Hausdorff to extend their properties.

- (Theorem of Jean Dieudonné) Every paracompact Hausdorff space is normal.
- Every paracompact Hausdorff space is a shrinking space, that is, every open cover of a paracompact Hausdorff space has a shrinking: another open cover indexed by the same set such that the closure of every set in the new cover lies inside the corresponding set in the old cover.
- On paracompact Hausdorff spaces, sheaf cohomology and Čech cohomology are equal.

=== Partitions of unity ===
The most important feature of paracompact Hausdorff spaces is that they admit partitions of unity subordinate to any open cover. This means the following: if X is a paracompact Hausdorff space with a given open cover, then there exists a collection of continuous functions on X with values in the unit interval [0, 1] such that:

- for every function f: X → R from the collection, there is an open set U from the cover such that the support of f is contained in U;
- for every point x in X, there is a neighborhood V of x such that all but finitely many of the functions in the collection are identically 0 in V and the sum of the nonzero functions is identically 1 in V.

In fact, a T_{1} space is Hausdorff and paracompact if and only if it admits partitions of unity subordinate to any open cover (see below). This property is sometimes used to define paracompact spaces (at least in the Hausdorff case).

Partitions of unity are useful because they often allow one to extend local constructions to the whole space. For instance, the integral of differential forms on paracompact manifolds is first defined locally (where the manifold looks like Euclidean space and the integral is well known), and this definition is then extended to the whole space via a partition of unity.

==== Proof that paracompact Hausdorff spaces admit partitions of unity ====
(Click "show" at right to see the proof or "hide" to hide it.)

A Hausdorff space $X\,$ is paracompact if and only if it every open cover admits a subordinate partition of unity. The if direction is straightforward. Now for the only if direction, we do this in a few stages.

Lemma 1: If $\mathcal{O}\,$ is a locally finite open cover, then there exists open sets $W_{U}\,$ for each $U\in\mathcal{O}\,$, such that each $\bar{W_{U}}\subseteq U\,$ and $\{W_{U}:U\in\mathcal{O}\}\,$ is a locally finite refinement.

Lemma 2: If $\mathcal{O}\,$ is a locally finite open cover, then there are continuous functions $f_{U}:X\to[0,1]\,$ such that $\operatorname{supp}~f_{U}\subseteq U\,$ and such that $f:=\sum_{U\in\mathcal{O}}f_{U}\,$ is a continuous function which is always non-zero and finite.

Theorem: In a paracompact Hausdorff space $X\,$, if $\mathcal{O}\,$ is an open cover, then there exists a partition of unity subordinate to it.

Proof (Lemma 1):
Let $\mathcal{V}\,$ be the collection of open sets meeting only finitely many sets in $\mathcal{O}\,$, and whose closure is contained in a set in $\mathcal{O}$. One can check as an exercise that this provides an open refinement, since paracompact Hausdorff spaces are regular, and since $\mathcal{O}\,$ is locally finite. Now replace $\mathcal{V}\,$ by a locally finite open refinement. One can easily check that each set in this refinement has the same property as that which characterised the original cover.

Now we define $W_{U}=\bigcup\{A\in\mathcal{V}:\bar{A}\subseteq U\}\,$. The property of $\mathcal{V}\,$ guarantees that every $A\in\mathcal{V}$ is contained in some $W_U$. Therefore $\{W_{U}:U\in\mathcal{O}\}\,$ is an open refinement of $\mathcal{O}\,$. Since we have $W_{U} \subseteq U$, this cover is immediately locally finite.
Now we want to show that each $\bar{W_{U}}\subseteq U\,$. For every $x \notin U$, we will prove that $x \notin \bar{W_U}$. Since we chose $\mathcal{V}$ to be locally finite, there is a neighbourhood $V[x]$ of $x$ such that only finitely many sets in $\mathcal{V}$ have non-empty intersection with $V[x]$, and we note $A_{1},...,A_{n},... \in \mathcal{V}$ those in the definition of $W_U$. Therefore we can decompose $W_U$ in two parts: $A_{1},...,A_{n} \in \mathcal{V}$ who intersect $V[x]$, and the rest $A \in \mathcal{V}$ who don't, which means that they are contained in the closed set $C:= X\setminus V[x]$. We now have $\bar{W_U} \subseteq \bar{A_1} \cup...\cup \bar{A_n}\cup C$. Since $\bar{A_i} \subseteq U$ and $x \notin U$, we have $x \notin \bar{A_i}$ for every $i$. And since $C$ is the complement of a neighbourhood of $x$, $x$ is also not in $C$. Therefore we have $x \notin \bar{W_U}$.

$\blacksquare\,$ (Lem 1)

Proof (Lemma 2):
Applying Lemma 1, let $f_{U}:X\to[0,1]\,$ be continuous maps with $f_{U}\upharpoonright\bar{W}_{U}=1\,$ and $\operatorname{supp}~f_{U}\subseteq U\,$ (by Urysohn's lemma for disjoint closed sets in normal spaces, which a paracompact Hausdorff space is). Note by the support of a function, we here mean the points not mapping to zero (and not the closure of this set). To show that $f=\sum_{U\in\mathcal{O}}f_{U}\,$ is always finite and non-zero, take $x\in X\,$, and let $N\,$ a neighbourhood of $x\,$ meeting only finitely many sets in $\mathcal{O}\,$; thus $x\,$ belongs to only finitely many sets in $\mathcal{O}\,$; thus $f_{U}(x)=0\,$ for all but finitely many $U\,$; moreover $x\in W_{U}\,$ for some $U\,$, thus $f_{U}(x)=1\,$; so $f(x)\,$ is finite and $\geq 1\,$. To establish continuity, take $x,N\,$ as before, and let $S=\{U\in\mathcal{O}:N\text{ meets }U\}\,$, which is finite; then $f\upharpoonright N=\sum_{U\in S}f_{U}\upharpoonright N\,$, which is a continuous function; hence the preimage under $f\,$ of a neighbourhood of $f(x)\,$ will be a neighbourhood of $x\,$.

$\blacksquare\,$ (Lem 2)

Proof (Theorem):
Take $\mathcal{O}^*\,$ a locally finite subcover of the refinement cover: $\{V\text{ open }:(\exists{U\in\mathcal{O}})\bar{V}\subseteq U\}\,$. Applying Lemma 2, we obtain continuous functions $f_{W}:X\to[0,1]\,$ with $\operatorname{supp}~f_{W}\subseteq W\,$ (thus the usual closed version of the support is contained in some $U\in\mathcal{O}\,$, for each $W\in\mathcal{O}^*\,$; for which their sum constitutes a continuous function which is always finite non-zero (hence $1/f\,$ is continuous positive, finite-valued). So replacing each $f_{W}\,$ by $f_{W}/f\,$, we have now — all things remaining the same — that their sum is everywhere $1\,$. Finally for $x\in X\,$, letting $N\,$ be a neighbourhood of $x\,$ meeting only finitely many sets in $\mathcal{O}^*\,$, we have $f_{W}\upharpoonright N=0\,$ for all but finitely many $W\in\mathcal{O}^*\,$ since each $\operatorname{supp}~f_{W}\subseteq W\,$. Thus we have a partition of unity subordinate to the original open cover.

$\blacksquare\,$ (Thm)

== Relationship with compactness ==
There is a similarity between the definitions of compactness and paracompactness: For paracompactness, "subcover" is replaced by "open refinement" and "finite" by is replaced by "locally finite". Both of these changes are significant: if we take the definition of paracompact and change "open refinement" back to "subcover", or "locally finite" back to "finite", we end up with the compact spaces in both cases.

Paracompactness has little to do with the notion of compactness, but rather more to do with breaking up topological space entities into manageable pieces.

=== Comparison of properties with compactness ===
Paracompactness is similar to compactness in the following respects:

- Every closed subset of a paracompact space is paracompact.
- Every paracompact Hausdorff space is normal.

It is different in these respects:

- A paracompact subset of a Hausdorff space need not be closed. In fact, for metric spaces, all subsets are paracompact.
- A product of paracompact spaces need not be paracompact. The square of the real line R in the lower limit topology is a classical example for this.

== Variations ==
There are several variations of the notion of paracompactness. To define them, we first need to extend the list of terms above:

A topological space is:

- metacompact if every open cover has an open point-finite refinement.
- orthocompact if every open cover has an open refinement such that the intersection of all the open sets about any point in this refinement is open.
- fully normal if every open cover has an open star refinement, and fully T_{4} if it is fully normal and T_{1} (see separation axioms).

The adverb "countably" can be added to any of the adjectives "paracompact", "metacompact", and "fully normal" to make the requirement apply only to countable open covers.

Every paracompact space is metacompact, and every metacompact space is orthocompact.

=== Definition of relevant terms for the variations ===
- Given a cover and a point, the star of the point in the cover is the union of all the sets in the cover that contain the point. In symbols, the star of x in U = {U_{α} : α in A} is
  $$\mathbf{U}^{*}(x) := \bigcup_{U_{\alpha} \ni x}U_{\alpha}.$$
  The notation for the star is not standardised in the literature, and this is just one possibility.
- A star refinement of a cover of a space X is a cover of the same space such that, given any point in the space, the star of the point in the new cover is a subset of some set in the old cover. In symbols, V is a star refinement of U = {U_{α} : α in A} if for any x in X, there exists a U_{α} in U such that V^{*}(x) is contained in U_{α}.
- A cover of a space X is point-finite (or point finite) if every point of the space belongs to only finitely many sets in the cover. In symbols, U is point finite if for any x in X, the set $\left\{\alpha \in A : x \in U_{\alpha} \right\}$ is finite.

As the names imply, a fully normal space is normal and a fully T_{4} space is T_{4}. Every fully T_{4} space is paracompact. In fact, for Hausdorff spaces, paracompactness and full normality are equivalent. Thus, a fully T_{4} space is the same thing as a paracompact Hausdorff space.

Without the Hausdorff property, paracompact spaces are not necessarily fully normal. Any compact space that is not regular provides an example.

A historical note: fully normal spaces were defined before paracompact spaces, in 1940, by John W. Tukey. The proof that all metrizable spaces are fully normal is easy. When it was proved by A.H. Stone that for Hausdorff spaces full normality and paracompactness are equivalent, he implicitly proved that all metrizable spaces are paracompact. Later Ernest Michael gave a direct proof of the latter fact and M.E. Rudin gave another, elementary, proof.

== See also ==
- a-paracompact space
- Paranormal space
