= Metacompact space =

Topological space with a point-finite open refinement for every cover

In the mathematical field of general topology, a topological space is said to be metacompact if every open cover has a point-finite open refinement. That is, given any open cover of the topological space, there is a refinement that is again an open cover with the property that every point is contained only in finitely many sets of the refining cover.

A space is countably metacompact if every countable open cover has a point-finite open refinement.

== Properties ==
The following can be said about metacompactness in relation to other properties of topological spaces:

- Every paracompact space is metacompact. This implies that every compact space is metacompact, and every metric space is metacompact. The converse does not hold: a counter-example is the Dieudonné plank.
- Every metacompact space is orthocompact.
- Every metacompact normal space is a shrinking space
- The product of a compact space and a metacompact space is metacompact. This follows from the tube lemma.
- An easy example of a non-metacompact space (but a countably metacompact space) is the Moore plane.
- In order for a Tychonoff space X to be compact it is necessary and sufficient that X be metacompact and pseudocompact (see Watson).

== Covering dimension ==
A topological space X is said to be of covering dimension n if every open cover of X has a point-finite open refinement such that no point of X is included in more than n + 1 sets in the refinement and if n is the minimum value for which this is true. If no such minimal n exists, the space is said to be of infinite covering dimension.

== See also ==
- Compact space
- Paracompact space
- Normal space
- Realcompact space
- Pseudocompact space
- Mesocompact space
- Tychonoff space
- Dowker space
