= Cover (topology) =

Subsets whose union equals the whole set

In mathematics, and more particularly in set theory, a cover (or covering) of a set $X$ is a family of subsets of $X$ whose union is all of $X$. More formally, if $C = \lbrace U_\alpha : \alpha \in A \rbrace$ is an indexed family of subsets $U_\alpha\subset X$ (indexed by the set $A$), then $C$ is a cover of $X$ if
$$\bigcup_{\alpha \in A}U_{\alpha} = X.$$
Thus the collection $\lbrace U_\alpha : \alpha \in A \rbrace$ is a cover of $X$ if each element of $X$ belongs to at least one of the subsets $U_{\alpha}$.

== Definition ==
Covers are commonly used in the context of topology. If the set $X$ is a topological space, then a cover $C$ of $X$ is a collection of subsets $\{U_\alpha\}_{\alpha\in A}$ of $X$ whose union is the whole space $X = \bigcup_{\alpha \in A}U_{\alpha}$. In this case $C$ is said to cover $X$, or that the sets $U_\alpha$ cover $X$.

If $Y$ is a (topological) subspace of $X$, then a cover of $Y$ is a collection of subsets $C = \{U_\alpha\}_{\alpha\in A}$ of $X$ whose union contains $Y$. That is, $C$ is a cover of $Y$ if
$$Y \subseteq \bigcup_{\alpha \in A}U_{\alpha}.$$
Here, $Y$ may be covered with either sets in $Y$ itself or sets in the parent space $X$.

A cover of $X$ is said to be locally finite if every point of $X$ has a neighborhood that intersects only finitely many sets in the cover. Formally, $C = \{U_\alpha\}$ is locally finite if, for any $x \in X$, there exists some neighborhood $N(x)$ of $x$ such that the set
$$\left\{ \alpha \in A : U_{\alpha} \cap N(x) \neq \varnothing \right\}$$
is finite. A cover of $X$ is said to be point finite if every point of $X$ is contained in only finitely many sets in the cover. A cover is point finite if locally finite, though the converse is not necessarily true.

== Subcover ==
Let $C$ be a cover of a topological space $X$. A subcover of $C$ is a subset of $C$ that still covers $X$. The cover $C$ is said to be an open cover if each of its members is an open set. That is, each $U_\alpha$ is contained in $T$, where $T$ is the topology on $X$.

A simple way to get a subcover is to omit the sets contained in another set in the cover. Consider specifically open covers. Let $\mathcal{B}$ be a topological basis of $X$ and $\mathcal{O}$ be an open cover of $X$. First, take $\mathcal{A} = \{ A \in \mathcal{B} : \text{ there exists } U \in \mathcal{O} \text{ such that } A \subseteq U \}$. Then $\mathcal{A}$ is a refinement of $\mathcal{O}$. Next, for each $A \in \mathcal{A},$ one may select a $U_{A} \in \mathcal{O}$ containing $A$ (requiring the axiom of choice). Then $\mathcal{C} = \{ U_{A} \in \mathcal{O} : A \in \mathcal{A} \}$ is a subcover of $\mathcal{O}.$ Hence the cardinality of a subcover of an open cover can be as small as that of any topological basis. Hence, second countability implies space is Lindelöf.

== Refinement ==
A refinement of a cover $C$ of a topological space $X$ is a new cover $D$ of $X$ such that every set in $D$ is contained in some set in $C$. Formally,

$D = \{ V_{\beta} \}_{\beta \in B}$ is a refinement of $C = \{ U_{\alpha} \}_{\alpha \in A}$ if for all $\beta \in B$ there exists $\alpha \in A$ such that $V_{\beta} \subseteq U_{\alpha}.$

In other words, there is a refinement map $\phi : B \to A$ satisfying $V_{\beta} \subseteq U_{\phi(\beta)}$ for every $\beta \in B.$ This map is used, for instance, in the Čech cohomology of $X$.

Every subcover is also a refinement, but the opposite is not always true. A subcover is made from the sets that are in the cover, but omitting some of them; whereas a refinement is made from any sets that are subsets of the sets in the cover.

The refinement relation on the set of covers of $X$ is transitive and reflexive, i.e. a Preorder. It is never asymmetric for $X\neq\empty$.

Generally speaking, a refinement of a given structure is another that in some sense contains it. Examples are to be found when partitioning an interval (one refinement of $a_0 < a_1 < \cdots < a_n$ being $a_0 < b_0 < a_1 < a_2 < \cdots < a_{n-1} < b_1 < a_n$), considering topologies (the standard topology in Euclidean space being a refinement of the trivial topology). When subdividing simplicial complexes (the first barycentric subdivision of a simplicial complex is a refinement), the situation is slightly different: every simplex in the finer complex is a face of some simplex in the coarser one, and both have equal underlying polyhedra.

Yet another notion of refinement is that of star refinement.

== Compactness ==
The language of covers is often used to define several topological properties related to compactness. A topological space $X$ is said to be:

- compact if every open cover has a finite subcover, (or equivalently that every open cover has a finite refinement);
- Lindelöf if every open cover has a countable subcover, (or equivalently that every open cover has a countable refinement);
- metacompact: if every open cover has a point-finite open refinement;
- paracompact: if every open cover admits a locally finite open refinement; and
- orthocompact: if every open cover has an interior-preserving open refinement.

For some more variations see the above articles.

== Covering dimension ==
A topological space $X$ is said to be of covering dimension $n$ if every open cover of $X$ has a point-finite open refinement such that no point of $X$ is included in more than $n+1$ sets in the refinement and if $n$ is the minimum value for which this is true. If no such minimal $n$ exists, the space is said to be of infinite covering dimension.

== See also ==
- Atlas (topology) – Set of charts that describes a manifold
- Bornology – Mathematical generalization of boundedness
- Covering space – Type of continuous map in topology
- Grothendieck topology – Mathematical structure
- Partition of a set – Mathematical ways to group elements of a set
- Set cover problem – Classical problem in combinatorics
- Star refinement
- Subpaving – Geometrical object
