= Complete topological space =

Complete topological space may refer to:

- a topological space equipped with an additional Cauchy space structure which is complete,
  - e. g., that it is a complete uniform space with respect to an aforementioned uniformity,
    - e. g., that it is a complete metric space with respect to an aforementioned metric;
- a topological space with some topological property related to the above:
  - that it is completely metrizable (often called (metrically) topologically complete),
  - or that it is Čech-complete (a property coinciding with completely metrizability on the class of metrizable spaces, but including some non-metrizable spaces as well),
  - or that it is completely uniformizable (also called topologically complete or Dieudonné-complete by some authors).
