= Cauchy-continuous function =

In mathematics, a Cauchy-continuous, or Cauchy-regular, function is a special kind of continuous function between metric spaces (or more general spaces). Cauchy-continuous functions have the useful property that they can always be (uniquely) extended to the Cauchy completion of their domain.

== Definition ==
Let $X$ and $Y$ be metric spaces, and let $f : X \to Y$ be a function from $X$ to $Y.$ Then $f$ is Cauchy-continuous if and only if, given any Cauchy sequence $\left(x_1, x_2, \ldots\right)$ in $X,$ the sequence $\left(f\left(x_1\right), f\left(x_2\right), \ldots\right)$ is a Cauchy sequence in $Y.$

== Properties ==
Every uniformly continuous function is also Cauchy-continuous. Conversely, if the domain $X$ is totally bounded, then every Cauchy-continuous function is uniformly continuous. More generally, even if $X$ is not totally bounded, a function on $X$ is Cauchy-continuous if and only if it is uniformly continuous on every totally bounded subset of $X.$

Every Cauchy-continuous function is continuous. Conversely, if the domain $X$ is complete, then every continuous function is Cauchy-continuous. More generally, even if $X$ is not complete, as long as $Y$ is complete, then any Cauchy-continuous function from $X$ to $Y$ can be extended to a continuous (and hence Cauchy-continuous) function defined on the Cauchy completion of $X;$ this extension is necessarily unique.

Combining these facts, if $X$ is compact, then continuous maps, Cauchy-continuous maps, and uniformly continuous maps on $X$ are all the same.

== Examples and non-examples ==
Since the real line $\R$ is complete, continuous functions on $\R$ are Cauchy-continuous. On the subspace $\Q$ of rational numbers, however, matters are different. For example, define a two-valued function so that $f(x)$ is $0$ when $x^2$ is less than $2$ but $1$ when $x^2$ is greater than $2.$ (Note that $x^2$ is never equal to $2$ for any rational number $x.$) This function is continuous on $\Q$ but not Cauchy-continuous, since it cannot be extended continuously to $\R.$ On the other hand, any uniformly continuous function on $\Q$ must be Cauchy-continuous. For a non-uniform example on $\Q,$ let $f(x)$ be $2^x$; this is not uniformly continuous (on all of $\Q$), but it is Cauchy-continuous. (This example works equally well on $\R.$)

A Cauchy sequence $\left(y_1, y_2, \ldots\right)$ in $Y$ can be identified with a Cauchy-continuous function from $\left\{1, 1/2, 1/3, \ldots\right\}$ to $Y,$ defined by $f\left(1/n\right) = y_n.$ If $Y$ is complete, then this can be extended to $\left\{1, 1/2, 1/3, \ldots\right\}\cup\{0\};$ $f(0)$ will be the limit of the Cauchy sequence.

== Generalizations ==
Cauchy continuity makes sense in situations more general than metric spaces, but then one must move from sequences to nets (or equivalently filters). The definition above applies, as long as the Cauchy sequence $\left(x_1, x_2, \ldots\right)$ is replaced with an arbitrary Cauchy net. Equivalently, a function $f$ is Cauchy-continuous if and only if, given any Cauchy filter $\mathcal{F}$ on $X,$ then $f(\mathcal{F})$ is a Cauchy filter base on $Y.$ This definition agrees with the above on metric spaces, but it also works for uniform spaces and, most generally, for Cauchy spaces.

Any directed set $A$ may be made into a Cauchy space. Then given any space $Y,$ the Cauchy nets in $Y$ indexed by $A$ are the same as the Cauchy-continuous functions from $A$ to $Y.$ If $Y$ is complete, then the extension of the function to $A \cup \{\infty\}$ will give the value of the limit of the net. (This generalizes the example of sequences above, where 0 is to be interpreted as $\frac{1}{\infty}.$)

== See also ==
- Cauchy space – Concept in general topology and analysis
- Heine–Cantor theorem
