= Uniform property =

Object of study in the category of uniform topological spaces

In the mathematical field of topology a uniform property or uniform invariant is a property of a uniform space that is invariant under uniform isomorphisms.

Since uniform spaces come as topological spaces and uniform isomorphisms are homeomorphisms, every topological property of a uniform space is also a uniform property. This article is (mostly) concerned with uniform properties that are not topological properties.

== Uniform properties ==
- Separated. A uniform space X is separated if the intersection of all entourages is equal to the diagonal in X × X. This is actually just a topological property, and equivalent to the condition that the underlying topological space is Hausdorff (or simply T_{0} since every uniform space is completely regular).
- Complete. A uniform space X is complete if every Cauchy net in X converges (i.e. has a limit point in X).
- Totally bounded (or Precompact). A uniform space X is totally bounded if for each entourage E ⊂ X × X there is a finite cover {U_{i}} of X such that U_{i} × U_{i} is contained in E for all i. Equivalently, X is totally bounded if for each entourage E there exists a finite subset {x_{i}} of X such that X is the union of all E[x_{i}]. In terms of uniform covers, X is totally bounded if every uniform cover has a finite subcover.
- Compact. A uniform space is compact if it is complete and totally bounded. Despite the definition given here, compactness is a topological property and so admits a purely topological description (every open cover has a finite subcover).
- Uniformly connected. A uniform space X is uniformly connected if every uniformly continuous function from X to a discrete uniform space is constant.
- Uniformly disconnected. A uniform space X is uniformly disconnected if it is not uniformly connected.

== See also ==
- Topological property
