= Finite topological space =

Mathematical concept

In mathematics, a finite topological space is a topological space for which the underlying point set is finite. That is, it is a topological space which has only finitely many elements.

Finite topological spaces are often used to provide examples of interesting phenomena or counterexamples to plausible sounding conjectures. William Thurston has called the study of finite topologies in this sense "an oddball topic that can lend good insight to a variety of questions".

== Topologies on a finite set ==
Let $X$ be a finite set. A topology on $X$ is a subset $\tau$ of $P(X)$ (the power set of $X$) such that

1. $\varnothing \in \tau$ and $X\in \tau$.
2. if $U, V \in \tau$ then $U \cup V \in \tau$.
3. if $U, V \in \tau$ then $U \cap V \in \tau$.

In other words, a subset $\tau$ of $P(X)$ is a topology if $\tau$ contains both $\varnothing$ and $X$ and is closed under arbitrary unions and intersections. Elements of $\tau$ are called open sets. The general description of topological spaces requires that a topology be closed under arbitrary (finite or infinite) unions of open sets, but only under intersections of finitely many open sets. Here, that distinction is unnecessary. Since the power set of a finite set is finite there can be only finitely many open sets (and only finitely many closed sets).

A topology on a finite set can also be thought of as a sublattice of $(P(X), \subset)$ which includes both the bottom element $\varnothing$ and the top element $X$.

== Examples ==
=== 0 or 1 points ===
There is a unique topology on the empty set ∅. The only open set is the empty one. Indeed, this is the only subset of ∅.

Likewise, there is a unique topology on a singleton set {a}. Here the open sets are ∅ and {a}. This topology is both discrete and trivial, although in some ways it is better to think of it as a discrete space since it shares more properties with the family of finite discrete spaces.

For any topological space X there is a unique continuous function from ∅ to X, namely the empty function. There is also a unique continuous function from X to the singleton space {a}, namely the constant function to a. In the language of category theory the empty space serves as an initial object in the category of topological spaces while the singleton space serves as a terminal object.

=== 2 points ===
Let X = {a,b} be a set with 2 elements. There are four distinct topologies on X:

1. {∅, {a,b}} (the trivial topology)
2. {∅, {a}, {a,b}}
3. {∅, {b}, {a,b}}
4. {∅, {a}, {b}, {a,b}} (the discrete topology)

The second and third topologies above are easily seen to be homeomorphic. The function from X to itself which swaps a and b is a homeomorphism. A topological space homeomorphic to one of these is called a Sierpiński space. So, in fact, there are only three inequivalent topologies on a two-point set: the trivial one, the discrete one, and the Sierpiński topology.

The specialization preorder on the Sierpiński space {a,b} with {b} open is given by: a ≤ a, b ≤ b, and a ≤ b.

=== 3 points ===
Let X = {a,b,c} be a set with 3 elements. There are 29 distinct topologies on X but only 9 inequivalent topologies:

1. {∅, {a,b,c}}
2. {∅, {c}, {a,b,c}}
3. {∅, {a,b}, {a,b,c}}
4. {∅, {c}, {a,b}, {a,b,c}}
5. {∅, {c}, {b,c}, {a,b,c}} (T_{0})
6. {∅, {c}, {a,c}, {b,c}, {a,b,c}} (T_{0})
7. {∅, {a}, {b}, {a,b}, {a,b,c}} (T_{0})
8. {∅, {b}, {c}, {a,b}, {b,c}, {a,b,c}} (T_{0})
9. {∅, {a}, {b}, {c}, {a,b}, {a,c}, {b,c}, {a,b,c}} (T_{0})

The last 5 of these are all T_{0}. The first one is trivial, while in 2, 3, and 4 the points a and b are topologically indistinguishable.

=== 4 points ===
Let X = {a,b,c,d} be a set with 4 elements. There are 355 distinct topologies on X but only 33 inequivalent topologies:

1. {∅, {a, b, c, d}}
2. {∅, {a, b, c}, {a, b, c, d}}
3. {∅, {a}, {a, b, c, d}}
4. {∅, {a}, {a, b, c}, {a, b, c, d}}
5. {∅, {a, b}, {a, b, c, d}}
6. {∅, {a, b}, {a, b, c}, {a, b, c, d}}
7. {∅, {a}, {a, b}, {a, b, c, d}}
8. {∅, {a}, {b}, {a, b}, {a, b, c, d}}
9. {∅, {a, b, c}, {d}, {a, b, c, d}}
10. {∅, {a}, {a, b, c}, {a, d}, {a, b, c, d}}
11. {∅, {a}, {a, b, c}, {d}, {a, d}, {a, b, c, d}}
12. {∅, {a}, {b, c}, {a, b, c}, {a, d}, {a, b, c, d}}
13. {∅, {a, b}, {a, b, c}, {a, b, d}, {a, b, c, d}}
14. {∅, {a, b}, {c}, {a, b, c}, {a, b, c, d}}
15. {∅, {a, b}, {c}, {a, b, c}, {a, b, d}, {a, b, c, d}}
16. {∅, {a, b}, {c}, {a, b, c}, {d}, {a, b, d}, {c, d}, {a, b, c, d}}
17. {∅, {b, c}, {a, d}, {a, b, c, d}}
18. {∅, {a}, {a, b}, {a, b, c}, {a, b, d}, {a, b, c, d}} (T_{0})
19. {∅, {a}, {a, b}, {a, c}, {a, b, c}, {a, b, c, d}} (T_{0})
20. {∅, {a}, {b}, {a, b}, {a, c}, {a, b, c}, {a, b, c, d}} (T_{0})
21. {∅, {a}, {a, b}, {a, b, c}, {a, b, c, d}} (T_{0})
22. {∅, {a}, {b}, {a, b}, {a, b, c}, {a, b, c, d}} (T_{0})
23. {∅, {a}, {a, b}, {c}, {a, c}, {a, b, c}, {a, b, d}, {a, b, c, d}} (T_{0})
24. {∅, {a}, {a, b}, {a, c}, {a, b, c}, {a, b, d}, {a, b, c, d}} (T_{0})
25. {∅, {a}, {b}, {a, b}, {a, b, c}, {a, b, d}, {a, b, c, d}} (T_{0})
26. {∅, {a}, {b}, {a, b}, {a, c}, {a, b, c}, {a, b, d}, {a, b, c, d}} (T_{0})
27. {∅, {a}, {b}, {a, b}, {b, c}, {a, b, c}, {a, d}, {a, b, d}, {a, b, c, d}} (T_{0})
28. {∅, {a}, {a, b}, {a, c}, {a, b, c}, {a, d}, {a, b, d}, {a, c, d}, {a, b, c, d}} (T_{0})
29. {∅, {a}, {b}, {a, b}, {a, c}, {a, b, c}, {a, d}, {a, b, d}, {a, c, d}, {a, b, c, d}} (T_{0})
30. {∅, {a}, {b}, {a, b}, {c}, {a, c}, {b, c}, {a, b, c}, {a, b, d}, {a, b, c, d}} (T_{0})
31. {∅, {a}, {b}, {a, b}, {c}, {a, c}, {b, c}, {a, b, c}, {a, d}, {a, b, d}, {a, c, d}, {a, b, c, d}} (T_{0})
32. {∅, {a}, {b}, {a, b}, {c}, {a, c}, {b, c}, {a, b, c}, {a, b, c, d}} (T_{0})
33. {∅, {a}, {b}, {a, b}, {c}, {a, c}, {b, c}, {a, b, c}, {d}, {a, d}, {b, d}, {a, b, d}, {c, d}, {a, c, d}, {b, c, d}, {a, b, c, d}} (T_{0})

The last 16 of these are all T_{0}.

== Properties ==
=== Specialization preorder ===
Topologies on a finite set X are in one-to-one correspondence with preorders on X. Recall that a preorder on X is a binary relation on X which is reflexive and transitive.

Given a (not necessarily finite) topological space X we can define a preorder on X by

x ≤ y if and only if x ∈ cl{y}

where cl{y} denotes the closure of the singleton set {y}. This preorder is called the specialization preorder on X. Every open set U of X will be an upper set with respect to ≤ (i.e. if x ∈ U and x ≤ y then y ∈ U). Now if X is finite, the converse is also true: every upper set is open in X. So for finite spaces, the topology on X is uniquely determined by ≤.

Going in the other direction, suppose (X, ≤) is a preordered set. Define a topology τ on X by taking the open sets to be the upper sets with respect to ≤. Then the relation ≤ will be the specialization preorder of (X, τ). The topology defined in this way is called the Alexandrov topology determined by ≤.

The equivalence between preorders and finite topologies can be interpreted as a version of Birkhoff's representation theorem, an equivalence between finite distributive lattices (the lattice of open sets of the topology) and partial orders (the partial order of equivalence classes of the preorder). This correspondence also works for a larger class of spaces called finitely generated spaces. Finitely generated spaces can be characterized as the spaces in which an arbitrary intersection of open sets is open. Finite topological spaces are a special class of finitely generated spaces.

=== Compactness and countability ===
Every finite topological space is compact since any open cover must already be finite. Indeed, compact spaces are often thought of as a generalization of finite spaces since they share many of the same properties.

Every finite topological space is also second-countable (there are only finitely many open sets) and separable (since the space itself is countable).

=== Separation axioms ===
If a finite topological space is T_{1} (in particular, if it is Hausdorff) then it must, in fact, be discrete. This is because the complement of a singleton is the union of finitely many closed singletons and therefore closed. It follows that each singleton must be open.

Therefore, any finite topological space which is not discrete cannot be T_{1}, Hausdorff, or anything stronger.

However, it is possible for a non-discrete finite space to be T_{0}. In general, two points x and y are topologically indistinguishable if and only if x ≤ y and y ≤ x, where ≤ is the specialization preorder on X. It follows that a space X is T_{0} if and only if the specialization preorder ≤ on X is a partial order. There are numerous partial orders on a finite set. Each defines a unique T_{0} topology.

Similarly, a space is R_{0} if and only if the specialization preorder is an equivalence relation. Given any equivalence relation on a finite set X the associated topology is the partition topology on X. The equivalence classes will be the classes of topologically indistinguishable points. Since the partition topology is pseudometrizable, a finite space is R_{0} if and only if it is completely regular.

Non-discrete finite spaces can also be normal. The excluded point topology on any finite set is a completely normal T_{0} space which is non-discrete.

=== Connectivity ===
Connectivity in a finite space X is best understood by considering the specialization preorder ≤ on X. We can associate to any preordered set X a directed graph Γ by taking the points of X as vertices and drawing an edge x → y whenever x ≤ y. The connectivity of a finite space X can be understood by considering the connectivity of the associated graph Γ.

In any topological space, if x ≤ y then there is a path from x to y. One can simply take f(0) = x and f(t) = y for t > 0. It is easy to verify that f is continuous. It follows that the path components of a finite topological space are precisely the (weakly) connected components of the associated graph Γ. That is, there is a topological path from x to y if and only if there is an undirected path between the corresponding vertices of Γ.

Every finite space is locally path-connected since the set

$$\mathop{\uarr}x = \{y \in X : x \leq y\}$$

is a path-connected open neighborhood of x that is contained in every other neighborhood. In other words, this single set forms a local base at x.

Therefore, a finite space is connected if and only if it is path-connected. The connected components are precisely the path components. Each such component is both closed and open in X.

Finite spaces may have stronger connectivity properties. A finite space X is

- hyperconnected if and only if there is a greatest element with respect to the specialization preorder. This is an element whose closure is the whole space X.
- ultraconnected if and only if there is a least element with respect to the specialization preorder. This is an element whose only neighborhood is the whole space X.

For example, the particular point topology on a finite space is hyperconnected while the excluded point topology is ultraconnected. The Sierpiński space is both.

=== Additional structure ===
A finite topological space is pseudometrizable if and only if it is R_{0}. In this case, one possible pseudometric is given by

$$d(x,y) = \begin{cases}0 & x\equiv y \\ 1 & x\not\equiv y\end{cases}$$

where x ≡ y means x and y are topologically indistinguishable. A finite topological space is metrizable if and only if it is discrete.

Likewise, a topological space is uniformizable if and only if it is R_{0}. The uniform structure will be the pseudometric uniformity induced by the above pseudometric.

=== Algebraic topology ===
Perhaps surprisingly, there are finite topological spaces with nontrivial fundamental groups. A simple example is the pseudocircle, which is space X with four points, two of which are open and two of which are closed. There is a continuous map from the unit circle S^{1} to X which is a weak homotopy equivalence (i.e. it induces an isomorphism of homotopy groups). It follows that the fundamental group of the pseudocircle is infinite cyclic.

More generally it has been shown that for any finite abstract simplicial complex K, there is a finite topological space X_{K} and a weak homotopy equivalence f : |K| → X_{K} where |K| is the geometric realization of K. It follows that the homotopy groups of |K| and X_{K} are isomorphic. In fact, the underlying set of X_{K} can be taken to be K itself, with the topology associated to the inclusion partial order.

== Number of topologies on a finite set ==
As discussed above, topologies on a finite set are in one-to-one correspondence with preorders on the set, and T_{0} topologies are in one-to-one correspondence with partial orders. Therefore, the number of topologies on a finite set is equal to the number of preorders and the number of T_{0} topologies is equal to the number of partial orders.

The table below lists the number of distinct (T_{0}) topologies on a set with n elements. It also lists the number of inequivalent (i.e. nonhomeomorphic) topologies.

Number of topologies on a set with n points
n	Distinct topologies	Distinct T_{0} topologies	Inequivalent topologies	Inequivalent T_{0} topologies
0	1	1	1	1
1	1	1	1	1
2	4	3	3	2
3	29	19	9	5
4	355	219	33	16
5	6942	4231	139	63
6	209527	130023	718	318
7	9535241	6129859	4535	2045
8	642779354	431723379	35979	16999
9	63260289423	44511042511	363083	183231
10	8977053873043	6611065248783	4717687	2567284
OEIS	A000798	A001035	A001930	A000112

Let T(n) denote the number of distinct topologies on a set with n points. There is no known simple formula to compute T(n) for arbitrary n. The Online Encyclopedia of Integer Sequences presently lists T(n) for n ≤ 18.

The number of distinct T_{0} topologies on a set with n points, denoted T_{0}(n), is related to T(n) by the formula

$$T(n) = \sum_{k=0}^{n}S(n,k)\,T_0(k)$$

where S(n,k) denotes the Stirling number of the second kind.

== See also ==
- Finite geometry
- Finite metric space
- Topological combinatorics
