= Balanced group =

In group theory, a balanced group is a topological group whose left and right uniform structures coincide.

== Definition ==
A topological group $G$ is said to be balanced if it satisfies the following equivalent conditions.

- The identity element $1_G\in G$ has a local base consisting of neighborhoods invariant under conjugation (i.e., ones for which $gUg^{-1}=U$ for all $g\in G$).
- The right uniform structure and the left uniform structure of $G$ are the same.
- The group multiplication $\cdot\colon G\times G\to G$ is uniformly continuous, with respect to the right uniform structure of $G$.
- The group multiplication $\cdot\colon G\times G\to G$ is uniformly continuous, with respect to the left uniform structure of $G$.

== Properties ==
The completion of a balanced group $G$ with respect to its uniform structure admits a unique topological group structure extending that of $G$. This generalizes the case of abelian groups and is a special case of the two-sided completion of an arbitrary topological group, which is with respect to the coarsest uniform structure finer than both the left and the right uniform structures.

For a unimodular group (i.e., a Hausdorff locally compact group whose left and right Haar measures coincide) $G$, the following two conditions are equivalent.

- $G$ is balanced.
- In the left von Neumann algebra of $G$, every element having a left inverse has a right inverse.

== Examples ==
Trivially every Abelian topological group is balanced. Every compact topological group (not necessarily Hausdorff) is balanced, which follows from the Heine–Cantor theorem for uniform spaces. Neither of these two sufficient conditions is necessary, for there are non-Abelian compact groups (such as the orthogonal group $\operatorname{O}(2)$) and there are non-compact abelian groups (such as $\mathbb R$).
