= Cauchy space =

Concept in general topology and analysis

In general topology and analysis, a Cauchy space is a generalization of metric spaces and uniform spaces for which the notion of Cauchy convergence still makes sense. Cauchy spaces were introduced by H. H. Keller in 1968, as an axiomatic tool derived from the idea of a Cauchy filter, in order to study completeness in topological spaces. The category of Cauchy spaces and Cauchy continuous maps is Cartesian closed, and contains the category of proximity spaces.

== Definition ==
Let $X$ be a set, $\mathcal{P}(X)$ the power set of $X$, and assume all filters are proper (that is, a filter may not contain the empty set).

A Cauchy space is a pair $(X, C)$ consisting of a set $X$ together with a family $C \subseteq \mathcal{P}(\mathcal{P}(X))$ of (proper) filters on $X$ having all of the following properties:

1. For each $x \in X,$ the discrete ultrafilter at $x,$ denoted by $U(x),$ is in $C.$
2. If $F \in C,$ $G$ is a proper filter, and $F$ is a subset of $G,$ then $G \in C.$
3. If $F, G \in C$ and if each member of $F$ intersects each member of $G,$ then $F \cap G \in C.$

An element of $C$ is called a Cauchy filter, and a map $f$ between Cauchy spaces $(X, C)$ and $(Y, D)$ is Cauchy continuous if $\uparrow f(C) \subseteq D$; that is, the image of each Cauchy filter in $X$ is a Cauchy filter base in $Y.$

== Properties and definitions ==
Any Cauchy space is also a convergence space, where a filter $F$ converges to $x$ if $F \cap U(x)$ is Cauchy. In particular, a Cauchy space carries a natural topology.

== Examples ==
- Any uniform space (hence any metric space, topological vector space, or topological group) is a Cauchy space; see Cauchy filter for definitions.
- A lattice-ordered group carries a natural Cauchy structure.
- Any directed set $A$ may be made into a Cauchy space by declaring a filter $F$ to be Cauchy if, given any element $n \in A,$ there is an element $U \in F$ such that $U$ is either a singleton or a subset of the tail $\{m : m \geq n\}.$ Then given any other Cauchy space $X,$ the Cauchy-continuous functions from $A$ to $X$ are the same as the Cauchy nets in $X$ indexed by $A.$ If $X$ is complete, then such a function may be extended to the completion of $A,$ which may be written $A \cup \{\infty\};$ the value of the extension at $\infty$ will be the limit of the net. In the case where $A$ is the set $\{1, 2, 3, \ldots\}$ of natural numbers (so that a Cauchy net indexed by $A$ is the same as a Cauchy sequence), then $A$ receives the same Cauchy structure as the metric space $\{1, 1/2, 1/3, \ldots\}.$

== Category of Cauchy spaces ==
The natural notion of morphism between Cauchy spaces is that of a Cauchy-continuous function, a concept that had earlier been studied for uniform spaces.

== See also ==
- Characterizations of the category of topological spaces
- Convergence space – Generalization of the notion of convergence that is found in general topology
- Filters in topology – Use of filters to describe and characterize all basic topological notions and results
- Pretopological space – Generalized topological space
- Proximity space – Structure describing a notion of "nearness" between subsets
