= Pseudometric =

Pseudometric may refer to:

- The metric of a pseudo-Riemannian manifold, a non-degenerate, smooth, symmetric tensor field of arbitrary signature
- Pseudometric space, a generalization of a metric that does not necessarily distinguish points (and so typically used to study certain non-Hausdorff spaces)
