= Overlapping interval topology =

In mathematics, the overlapping interval topology is a topology which is used to illustrate various topological principles.

== Definition ==
Given the closed interval $[-1,1]$ of the real number line, the open sets of the topology are generated from the half-open intervals $(a,1]$ with $a < 0$ and $[-1,b)$ with $b > 0$. The topology therefore consists of intervals of the form $[-1,b)$, $(a,b)$, and $(a,1]$ with $a < 0 < b$, together with $[-1,1]$ itself and the empty set.

== Properties ==
Any two distinct points in $[-1,1]$ are topologically distinguishable under the overlapping interval topology as one can always find an open set containing one but not the other point. However, every non-empty open set contains the point 0 which can therefore not be separated from any other point in $[-1,1]$, making $[-1,1]$ with the overlapping interval topology an example of a T_{0} space that is not a T_{1} space.

The overlapping interval topology is second countable, with a countable basis being given by the intervals $[-1,s)$, $(r,s)$ and $(r,1]$ with $r < 0 < s$ and r and s rational.

== See also ==
- List of topologies
- Particular point topology, a topology where sets are considered open if they are empty or contain a particular, arbitrarily chosen, point of the topological space
