= Completely metrizable space =

In mathematics, a completely metrizable space (metrically topologically complete space) is a topological space (X, T) for which there exists at least one metric d on X such that (X, d) is a complete metric space and d induces the topology T. It is as such a special case of metrizable space.

The term topologically complete space is employed by some authors as a synonym for completely metrizable space, but sometimes also used for other classes of topological spaces, like completely uniformizable spaces or Čech-complete spaces.

== Difference between complete metric space and completely metrizable space ==
The distinction between a completely metrizable space and a complete metric space lies in the words there exists at least one metric in the definition of completely metrizable space, which is not the same as there is given a metric (the latter would yield the definition of complete metric space). Once we make the choice of the metric on a completely metrizable space (out of all the complete metrics compatible with the topology), we get a complete metric space. In other words, the category of completely metrizable spaces is a subcategory of that of topological spaces, while the category of complete metric spaces is not (instead, it is a subcategory of the category of metric spaces). Complete metrizability is a topological property while completeness is a property of the metric.

== Examples ==
- The space (0,1) ⊂ R, the open unit interval, is not a complete metric space with its usual metric inherited from R, but it is completely metrizable since it is homeomorphic to R.
- The space Q of rational numbers with the subspace topology inherited from R is metrizable but not completely metrizable.

== Properties ==
- A topological space X is completely metrizable if and only if X is metrizable and a G_{δ} in its Stone–Čech compactification βX.
- A subspace of a completely metrizable space X is completely metrizable if and only if it is G_{δ} in X.
- A countable product of nonempty metrizable spaces is completely metrizable in the product topology if and only if each factor is completely metrizable. Hence, a product of nonempty metrizable spaces is completely metrizable if and only if at most countably many factors have more than one point and each factor is completely metrizable.
- For every metrizable space there exists a completely metrizable space containing it as a dense subspace, since every metric space has a completion. In general, there are many such completely metrizable spaces, since completions of a topological space with respect to different metrics compatible with its topology can give topologically different completions.

== Completely metrizable abelian topological groups ==
When talking about spaces with more structure than just topology, like topological groups, the natural meaning of the words “completely metrizable” would arguably be the existence of a complete metric that is also compatible with that extra structure, in addition to inducing its topology. For abelian topological groups and topological vector spaces, “compatible with the extra structure” might mean that the metric is invariant under translations.

However, no confusion can arise when talking about an abelian topological group or a topological vector space being completely metrizable: it can be proven that every abelian topological group (and thus also every topological vector space) that is completely metrizable as a topological space (i. e., admits a complete metric that induces its topology) also admits an invariant complete metric that induces its topology.

This implies e. g. that every completely metrizable topological vector space is complete. Indeed, a topological vector space is called complete if and only if its uniformity (induced by its topology and addition operation) is complete; the uniformity induced by a translation-invariant metric that induces the topology coincides with the original uniformity.

== See also ==
- Complete metric space
- Completely uniformizable space
- Metrizable space
