= Uniformly connected space =

Type of uniform space

In topology and related areas of mathematics, a uniformly connected space or Cantor connected space is a uniform space U such that every uniformly continuous function from U to a discrete uniform space is constant.

A uniform space U is called uniformly disconnected if it is not uniformly connected.

== Properties ==
A compact uniform space is uniformly connected if and only if it is connected.

== Examples ==
- Every connected space is uniformly connected.
- The rational numbers and the irrational numbers are disconnected but uniformly connected.

== See also ==
- Connectedness
