= Pseudocircle =

Four-point non-Hausdorff topological space

The pseudocircle is the finite topological space X consisting of four distinct points {a,b,c,d} with the following non-Hausdorff topology:
$$\{\{a,b,c,d\}, \{a,b,c\}, \{a,b,d\}, \{a,b\}, \{a\}, \{b\}, \varnothing\}.$$

This topology corresponds to the partial order $a<c,\ b<c,\ a<d,\ b<d$ where the open sets are downward-closed sets. X is highly pathological from the usual viewpoint of general topology, as it fails to satisfy any separation axiom besides T_{0}. However, from the viewpoint of algebraic topology, X has the remarkable property that it is indistinguishable from the circle S^{1}. More precisely, the continuous map $f$ from S^{1} to X (where we think of S^{1} as the unit circle in $\Reals^2$) given by
$$f(x,y) = \begin{cases}a,& x<0\\ b,& x>0\\ c,& (x,y)=(0,1)\\ d,& (x,y)=(0,-1)\end{cases}$$
is a weak homotopy equivalence; that is, $f$ induces an isomorphism on all homotopy groups. It follows that $f$ also induces an isomorphism on singular homology and cohomology, and more generally an isomorphism on all ordinary or extraordinary homology and cohomology theories (e.g., K-theory).

This can be proven using the following observation. Like S^{1}, X is the union of two contractible open sets {a,b,c} and {a,b,d} whose intersection {a,b} is also the union of two disjoint contractible open sets {a} and {b}. So, like S^{1}, the result follows from the groupoid Seifert-van Kampen theorem, as in the book Topology and Groupoids.

More generally, McCord has shown that, for any finite simplicial complex K, there is a finite topological space X_{K} which has the same weak homotopy type as the geometric realization |K| of K. More precisely, there is a functor taking K to X_{K}, from the category of finite simplicial complexes and simplicial maps and a natural weak homotopy equivalence from |K| to X_{K}.

== See also ==
- List of topologies – List of concrete topologies and topological spaces
