= Uniform isomorphism =

Uniformly continuous homeomorphism

In topology, a uniform isomorphism or uniform homeomorphism is a special isomorphism between uniform spaces that preserves uniform properties. Uniform spaces with uniform maps form a category. An isomorphism between uniform spaces is called a uniform isomorphism.

== Definition ==
A function $f$ between two uniform spaces $X$ and $Y$ is called a uniform isomorphism if it satisfies the following properties

- $f$ is a bijection
- $f$ is uniformly continuous
- the inverse function $f^{-1}$ is uniformly continuous

In other words, a uniform isomorphism is a uniformly continuous bijection between uniform spaces whose inverse is also uniformly continuous.

If a uniform isomorphism exists between two uniform spaces they are called uniformly isomorphic or uniformly equivalent.

Uniform embeddings

A uniform embedding is an injective uniformly continuous map $i : X \to Y$ between uniform spaces whose inverse $i^{-1} : i(X) \to X$ is also uniformly continuous, where the image $i(X)$ has the subspace uniformity inherited from $Y.$

== Examples ==
The uniform structures induced by equivalent norms on a vector space are uniformly isomorphic.

== See also ==
- Homeomorphism – Mapping which preserves all topological properties of a given space — an isomorphism between topological spaces
- Isometric isomorphism – Distance-preserving mathematical transformation — an isomorphism between metric spaces
