= Heine–Cantor theorem =

Mathematical theorem

In mathematics, the Heine–Cantor theorem states that a continuous function between two metric spaces is uniformly continuous if its domain is compact. The theorem is named after Eduard Heine and Georg Cantor.

Heine–Cantor theorem—If $f \colon M \to N$ is a continuous function between two metric spaces $M$ and $N$, and $M$ is compact, then $f$ is uniformly continuous.

An important special case of the Cantor theorem is that every continuous function from a closed bounded interval to the real numbers is uniformly continuous.

Proof of Heine–Cantor theorem

Suppose that $M$ and $N$ are two metric spaces with metrics $d_M$ and $d_N$, respectively. Suppose further that a function $f: M \to N$ is continuous and $M$ is compact. We want to show that $f$ is uniformly continuous, that is, for every positive real number $\varepsilon > 0$ there exists a positive real number $\delta > 0$ such that for all points $x, y$ in the function domain $M$, $d_M(x,y) < \delta$ implies that $d_N(f(x), f(y)) < \varepsilon$.

Consider some positive real number $\varepsilon > 0$. By continuity, for any point $x$ in the domain $M$, there exists some positive real number $\delta_x > 0$ such that $d_N(f(x),f(y)) < \varepsilon/2$ when $d_M(x,y) < \delta _x$, i.e., a fact that $y$ is within $\delta_x$ of $x$ implies that $f(y)$ is within $\varepsilon / 2$ of $f(x)$.

Let $U_x$ be the open $\delta_x/2$-neighborhood of $x$, i.e. the set

$$U_x = \left\{ y \mid d_M(x,y) < \frac 1 2 \delta_x \right\}.$$

Since each point $x$ is contained in its own $U_x$, we find that the collection $\{U_x \mid x \in M\}$ is an open cover of $M$. Since $M$ is compact, this cover has a finite subcover $\{U_{x_1}, U_{x_2}, \ldots, U_{x_n}\}$ where $x_1, x_2, \ldots, x_n \in M$. Each of these open sets has an associated radius $\delta_{x_i}/2$. Let us now define $\delta = \min_{1 \leq i \leq n} \delta_{x_i}/2$, i.e. the minimum radius of these open sets. Since we have a finite number of positive radii, this minimum $\delta$ is well-defined and positive. We now show that this $\delta$ works for the definition of uniform continuity.

Suppose that $d_M(x,y) < \delta$ for any two $x, y$ in $M$. Since the sets $U_{x_i}$ form an open (sub)cover of our space $M$, we know that $x$ must lie within one of them, say $U_{x_i}$. Then we have that $d_M(x, x_i) < \frac{1}{2}\delta_{x_i}$. The triangle inequality then implies that

$$d_M(x_i, y) \leq d_M(x_i, x) + d_M(x, y) < \frac{1}{2} \delta_{x_i} + \delta \leq \delta_{x_i},$$

implying that $x$ and $y$ are both at most $\delta_{x_i}$ away from $x_i$. By definition of $\delta_{x_i}$, this implies that $d_N(f(x_i),f(x))$ and $d_N(f(x_i), f(y))$ are both less than $\varepsilon/2$. Applying the triangle inequality then yields the desired

$$d_N(f(x), f(y)) \leq d_N(f(x_i), f(x)) + d_N(f(x_i), f(y)) < \frac{\varepsilon}{2}  + \frac{\varepsilon}{2} = \varepsilon.$$

∎

For an alternative proof in the case of $M = [a, b]$, a closed interval, see the article Non-standard calculus.

== See also ==
- Cauchy-continuous function
