= Totally bounded space =

Generalization of compactness

In topology and related branches of mathematics, total-boundedness is a generalization of compactness for circumstances in which a set is not necessarily closed. A totally bounded set can be covered by finitely many subsets of every fixed “size” (where the meaning of “size” depends on the structure of the ambient space).

The term precompact (or pre-compact) is sometimes used with the same meaning, but precompact is also used to mean relatively compact. These definitions coincide for subsets of a complete metric space, but not in general.

== In metric spaces ==
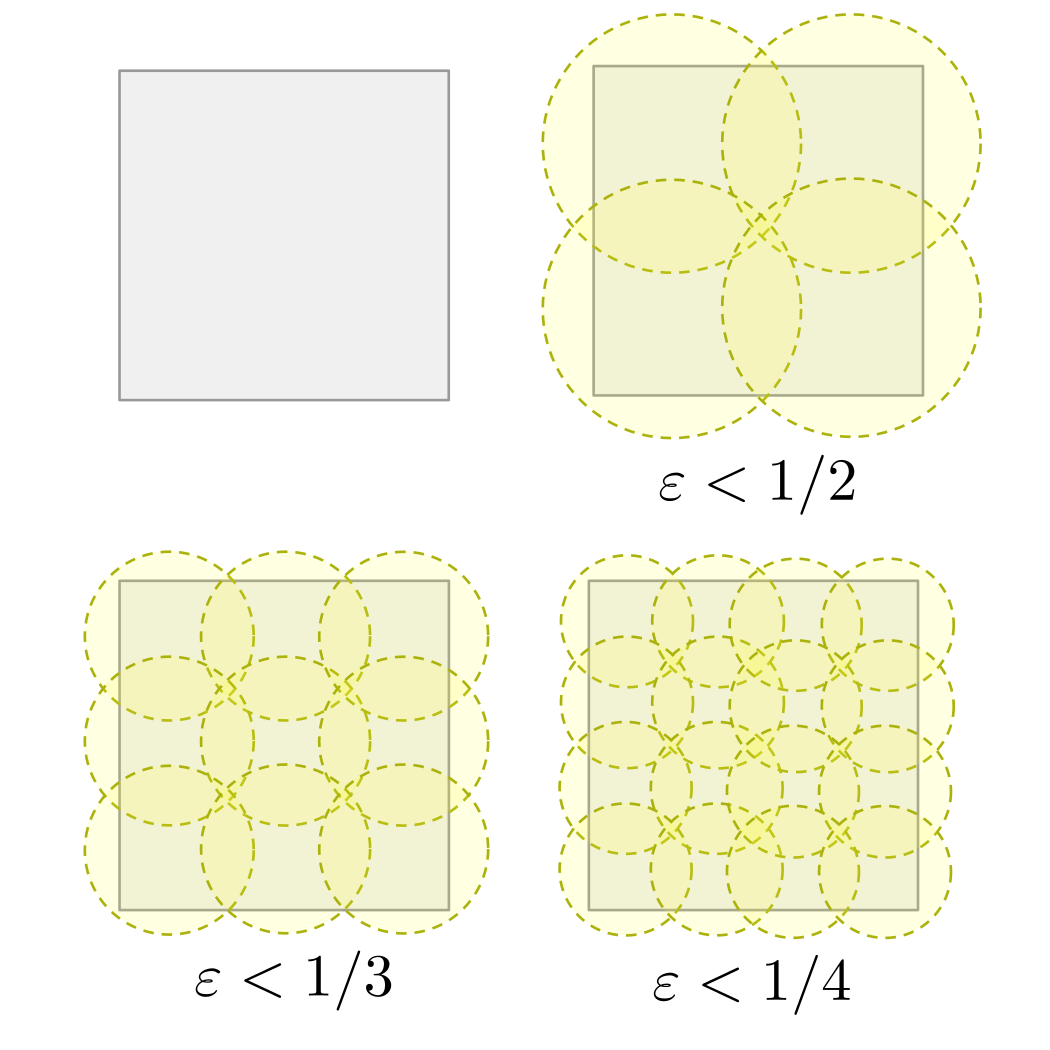
[0, 1]^{2} is a totally bounded space because for every ε > 0, the unit square can be covered by finitely many open discs of radius ε.

A metric space $(M,d)$ is totally bounded if and only if for every real number $\varepsilon > 0$, there exists a finite collection of open balls of radius $\varepsilon$ whose centers lie in M and whose union contains M. Equivalently, the metric space M is totally bounded if and only if for every $\varepsilon >0$, there exists a finite cover such that the radius of each element of the cover is at most $\varepsilon$. This is equivalent to the existence of a finite ε-net. A metric space is totally bounded iff every sequence admits a Cauchy subsequence; in complete metric spaces, a set is compact if and only if it is closed and totally bounded.

Each totally bounded space is bounded (as the union of finitely many bounded sets is bounded). The reverse is true for subsets of Euclidean space (with the subspace topology), but not in general. For example, an infinite set equipped with the discrete metric is bounded but not totally bounded: every discrete ball of radius $\varepsilon = 1/2$ or less is a singleton, and no finite union of singletons can cover an infinite set.

=== Uniform (topological) spaces ===
A metric appears in the definition of total boundedness only to ensure that each element of the finite cover is of comparable size, and can be weakened to that of a uniform structure. A subset S of a uniform space X is totally bounded if and only if, for any entourage E, there exists a finite cover of S by subsets of X each of whose Cartesian squares is a subset of E. (In other words, E replaces the "size" ε, and a subset is of size E if its Cartesian square is a subset of E.)

The definition can be extended still further, to any category of spaces with a notion of compactness and Cauchy completion: a space is totally bounded if and only if its (Cauchy) completion is compact.

== Examples and elementary properties ==
- In a metric space, every compact set is totally bounded.
- Every totally bounded set is bounded.
- A subset of the real line, or more generally of finite-dimensional Euclidean space, is totally bounded if and only if it is bounded.
- More generally, if a metric space has the Heine-Borel property, then a subset is bounded if and only if it is totally bounded.
- The unit ball in a Hilbert space, or more generally in a Banach space, is totally bounded (in the norm topology) if and only if the space has finite dimension.
- Equicontinuous bounded functions on a compact set are precompact in the uniform topology; this is the Arzelà–Ascoli theorem.
- A metric space is separable if and only if it is homeomorphic to a totally bounded metric space.
- The closure of a totally bounded subset is again totally bounded.

=== Comparison with compact sets ===
In metric spaces, a set is compact if and only if it is complete and totally bounded; without the axiom of choice, only the forward direction holds. Precompact sets share a number of properties with compact sets.

- Like compact sets, the union of finitely many totally bounded sets is totally bounded.
- Unlike compact sets, every subset of a totally bounded set is again totally bounded.
- The continuous image of a compact set is compact. The uniformly continuous image of a precompact set is precompact.

== In topological groups ==
Although the notion of total boundedness is closely tied to metric spaces, the greater algebraic structure of topological groups allows one to trade away some separation properties. For example, in metric spaces, a set is compact if and only if complete and totally bounded. Under the definition below, the same holds for any topological vector space (not necessarily Hausdorff nor complete).

The general logical form of the definition is: a subset $S$ of a space $X$ is totally bounded if and only if, given any size $E,$ there exists a finite cover $\mathcal{O}$ of $S$ such that each element of $\mathcal{O}$ has size at most $E.$ $X$ is then totally bounded if and only if it is totally bounded when considered as a subset of itself.

We adopt the convention that, for any neighborhood $U \subseteq X$ of the identity, a subset $S \subseteq X$ is called (left) $U$-small if and only if $(- S) + S \subseteq U.$ A subset $S$ of a topological group $X$ is (left) totally bounded if it satisfies any of the following equivalent conditions:

1. Definition: For any neighborhood $U$ of the identity $0,$ there exist finitely many $x_1, \ldots, x_n \in X$ such that $S \subseteq \bigcup_{j=1}^n \left(x_j + U\right).$
2. For any neighborhood $U$ of $0,$ there exists a finite subset $F \subseteq X$ such that $S \subseteq F + U$ (where the right hand side is the Minkowski sum $F + U := \{ f + u : f \in F, u \in U \}$).
3. For any neighborhood $U$ of $0,$ there exist finitely many subsets $B_1, \ldots, B_n$ of $X$ such that $S \subseteq B_1 \cup \cdots \cup B_n$ and each $B_j$ is $U$-small.
4. For any given filter subbase $\mathcal{B}$ of the identity element's neighborhood filter $\mathcal{N}$ (which consists of all neighborhoods of $0$ in $X$) and for every $B \in \mathcal{B},$ there exists a cover of $S$ by finitely many $B$-small subsets of $X.$
5. $S$ is Cauchy bounded: for every neighborhood $U$ of the identity and every countably infinite subset $I$ of $S,$ there exist distinct $x, y \in I$ such that $x - y \in U.$ (If $S$ is finite then this condition is satisfied vacuously).
6. Any of the following three sets satisfies (any of the above definitions of) being (left) totally bounded:
  1. The closure $\overline{S} = \operatorname{cl}_X S$ of $S$ in $X.$
    - This set being in the list means that the following characterization holds: $S$ is (left) totally bounded if and only if $\operatorname{cl}_X S$ is (left) totally bounded (according to any of the defining conditions mentioned above). The same characterization holds for the other sets listed below.
  2. The image of $S$ under the canonical quotient $X \to X / \overline{\{ 0 \}},$ which is defined by $x \mapsto x + \overline{\{ 0 \}}$ (where $0$ is the identity element).
  3. The sum $S + \operatorname{cl}_X \{ 0 \}.$

The term pre-compact usually appears in the context of Hausdorff topological vector spaces. In that case, the following conditions are also all equivalent to $S$ being (left) totally bounded:

7. In the completion $\widehat{X}$ of $X,$ the closure $\operatorname{cl}_{\widehat{X}} S$ of $S$ is compact.
8. Every ultrafilter on $S$ is a Cauchy filter.

The definition of right totally bounded is analogous: simply swap the order of the products.

Condition 4 implies any subset of $\operatorname{cl}_X \{ 0 \}$ is totally bounded (in fact, compact; see § Comparison with compact sets above). If $X$ is not Hausdorff then, for example, $\{ 0 \}$ is a compact complete set that is not closed.

=== Topological vector spaces ===
Any topological vector space is an abelian topological group under addition, so the above conditions apply. Historically, statement 6(a) was the first reformulation of total boundedness for topological vector spaces; it dates to a 1935 paper of John von Neumann.

This definition has the appealing property that, in a locally convex space endowed with the weak topology, the precompact sets are exactly the bounded sets.

For separable Banach spaces, there is a nice characterization of the precompact sets (in the norm topology) in terms of weakly convergent sequences of functionals: if $X$ is a separable Banach space, then $S \subseteq X$ is precompact if and only if every weakly convergent sequence of functionals converges uniformly on $S.$

==== Interaction with convexity ====
- The balanced hull of a totally bounded subset of a topological vector space is again totally bounded.
- The Minkowski sum of two compact (totally bounded) sets is compact (resp. totally bounded).
- In a locally convex (Hausdorff) space, the convex hull and the disked hull of a totally bounded set $K$ is totally bounded if and only if $K$ is complete.

== See also ==
- Compact space
- Locally compact space
- Measure of non-compactness
- Orthocompact space
- Paracompact space
- Relatively compact subspace

== Bibliography ==
- Jarchow, Hans (1981). Locally convex spaces. Stuttgart: B.G. Teubner. ISBN 978-3-519-02224-4. OCLC 8210342.
- Narici, Lawrence; Beckenstein, Edward (2011). Topological Vector Spaces. Pure and applied mathematics (Second ed.). Boca Raton, FL: CRC Press. ISBN 978-1584888666. OCLC 144216834.
- Schaefer, Helmut H.; Wolff, Manfred P. (1999). Topological Vector Spaces. GTM. Vol. 8 (Second ed.). New York, NY: Springer New York Imprint Springer. ISBN 978-1-4612-7155-0. OCLC 840278135.
- Sutherland, W. A. (1975). Introduction to metric and topological spaces. Oxford University Press. ISBN 0-19-853161-3. Zbl 0304.54002.
- Trèves, François (2006) [1967]. Topological Vector Spaces, Distributions and Kernels. Mineola, N.Y.: Dover Publications. ISBN 978-0-486-45352-1. OCLC 853623322.
- Willard, Stephen (2004). General Topology. Dover Publications. ISBN 0-486-43479-6.
