= Pseudometric space =

Generalization of metric spaces in mathematics

In mathematics, a pseudometric space is a generalization of a metric space in which the distance between two distinct points can be zero. Pseudometric spaces were introduced by Đuro Kurepa in 1934. In the same way as every normed space is a metric space, every seminormed space is a pseudometric space. Because of this analogy, the term semimetric space (which has a different meaning in topology) is sometimes used as a synonym, especially in functional analysis.

When a topology is generated using a family of pseudometrics, the space is called a gauge space.

== Definition ==
A pseudometric space $(X,d)$ is a set $X$ together with a non-negative real-valued function $d : X \times X \longrightarrow \R_{\geq 0},$ called a pseudometric, such that for every $x, y, z \in X,$

1. $d(x,x) = 0.$
2. Symmetry: $d(x,y) = d(y,x)$
3. Subadditivity/Triangle inequality: $d(x,z) \leq d(x,y) + d(y,z)$

Unlike a metric space, points in a pseudometric space need not be distinguishable; that is, one may have $d(x, y) = 0$ for distinct values $x \neq y.$

It is worth noting that Symmetry and classical Triangle inequality can be replaced with single modified Triangle one: $d(x,y) \leq d(x,z) + d(y,z)$. This inequality combines symmetry and classical Triangle inequality.

== Examples ==
Any metric space is a pseudometric space. Pseudometrics arise naturally in functional analysis. Consider the space $\mathcal{F}(X)$ of real-valued functions $f : X \to \R$ together with a special point $x_0 \in X.$ This point then induces a pseudometric on the space of functions, given by
$$d(f,g) = \left|f(x_0) - g(x_0)\right|$$
for $f, g \in \mathcal{F}(X)$

A seminorm $p$ induces the pseudometric $d(x, y) = p(x - y)$. This is a convex function of an affine function of $x$ (in particular, a translation), and therefore convex in $x$. (Likewise for $y$.)

Conversely, a homogeneous, translation-invariant pseudometric induces a seminorm.

Pseudometrics also arise in the theory of hyperbolic complex manifolds: see Kobayashi metric.

Every measure space $(\Omega,\mathcal{A},\mu)$ can be viewed as a complete pseudometric space by defining
$$d(A,B) := \mu(A \vartriangle B)$$
for all $A, B \in \mathcal{A},$ where the triangle denotes symmetric difference.

If $f : X_1 \to X_2$ is a function and d_{2} is a pseudometric on X_{2}, then $d_1(x, y) := d_2(f(x), f(y))$ gives a pseudometric on X_{1}. If d_{2} is a metric and f is injective, then d_{1} is a metric.

== Topology ==
The pseudometric topology is the topology generated by the open balls
$$B_r(p) = \{x \in X : d(p, x) < r\},$$
which form a basis for the topology. A topological space is said to be a pseudometrizable space if the space can be given a pseudometric such that the pseudometric topology coincides with the given topology on the space.

The difference between pseudometrics and metrics is entirely topological. That is, a pseudometric is a metric if and only if the topology it generates is T_{0} (that is, distinct points are topologically distinguishable).

The definitions of Cauchy sequences and metric completion for metric spaces carry over to pseudometric spaces unchanged. The notion of a continuous function is also largely unchanged when applied to a pseudometric space.

== Metric identification ==
The vanishing of the pseudometric induces an equivalence relation, called the metric identification, that converts the pseudometric space into a full-fledged metric space. This is done by defining $x\sim y$ if $d(x,y)=0$. Let $X^* = X/{\sim}$ be the quotient space of $X$ by this equivalence relation and define
$$\begin{align}
d^*:(X/\sim)&\times (X/\sim) \longrightarrow \R_{\geq 0} \\
d^*([x],[y])&=d(x,y)
\end{align}$$
This is well defined because for any $x' \in [x]$ we have that $d(x, x') = 0$ and so $d(x', y) \leq d(x, x') + d(x, y) = d(x, y)$ and vice versa. Then $d^*$ is a metric on $X^*$ and $(X^*,d^*)$ is a well-defined metric space, called the metric space induced by the pseudometric space $(X, d)$.

The metric identification preserves the induced topologies. That is, a subset $A \subseteq X$ is open (or closed) in $(X, d)$ if and only if $\pi(A) = [A]$ is open (or closed) in $\left(X^*, d^*\right)$ and $A$ is saturated. The topological identification is the Kolmogorov quotient.

An example of this construction is the completion of a metric space by its Cauchy sequences.

== Properties ==
- In a pseudometric space, the set of all points (say, X) which are of distance 0 relative to another set Y in the space is the closure of Y, or cl(Y) = X.

== See also ==
- Generalised metric – Metric geometry
- Uniform space – Topological space with a notion of uniform properties
- Pseudo-Riemannian manifold – Differentiable manifold with nondegenerate metric tensor
- Metric space – Mathematical space with a notion of distance
- Metrizable topological vector space – Topological vector space whose topology can be defined by a metric
