= Completely uniformizable space =

In mathematics, a topological space (X, T) is called completely uniformizable (or Dieudonné complete) if there exists at least one complete uniformity that induces the topology T. Some authors additionally require X to be Hausdorff. Some authors have called these spaces topologically complete, although that term has also been used in other meanings like completely metrizable, which is a stronger property than completely uniformizable.

== Properties ==
- Every completely uniformizable space is uniformizable and thus completely regular.
- A completely regular space X is completely uniformizable if and only if the fine uniformity on X is complete.
- Every regular paracompact space (in particular, every Hausdorff paracompact space) is completely uniformizable.
- (Shirota's theorem) A completely regular Hausdorff space is realcompact if and only if it is completely uniformizable and contains no closed discrete subspace of measurable cardinality.

Every metrizable space is paracompact, hence completely uniformizable. As there exist metrizable spaces that are not completely metrizable, complete uniformizability is a strictly weaker condition than complete metrizability.

== See also ==
- Completely metrizable space
- Complete topological vector space – Structure in functional analysis
- Uniform space – Topological space with a notion of uniform properties
