= Uniform space =

Topological space with a notion of uniform properties

In the mathematical field of topology, a uniform space is a set with additional structure that is used to define uniform properties, such as completeness, uniform continuity and uniform convergence. Uniform spaces generalize metric spaces and topological groups, but the concept is designed to formulate the weakest axioms needed for most proofs in analysis.

In addition to the usual properties of a topological structure, in a uniform space one formalizes the notions of relative closeness and closeness of points. In other words, ideas like "x is closer to a than y is to b" make sense in uniform spaces. By comparison, in a general topological space, given sets A,B it is meaningful to say that a point x is arbitrarily close to A (i.e., in the closure of A), or perhaps that A is a smaller neighborhood of x than B, but notions of closeness of points and relative closeness are not described well by topological structure alone.

== Definition ==
There are three equivalent definitions for a uniform space. They all consist of a space equipped with a uniform structure.

=== Entourage definition ===
This definition adapts the presentation of a topological space in terms of neighborhood systems. A nonempty collection $\Phi$ of subsets of $X \times X$ is a uniform structure (or a uniformity) if it satisfies the following axioms:

1. If $U\in\Phi$ then $\Delta \subseteq U,$ where $\Delta = \{(x,x) : x \in X\}$ is the diagonal on $X \times X.$
2. If $U\in\Phi$ and $U \subseteq V \subseteq X \times X$ then $V\in\Phi.$
3. If $U\in\Phi$ and $V\in\Phi$ then $U \cap V \in \Phi.$
4. If $U\in\Phi$ then there is some $V \in\Phi$ such that $V \circ V \subseteq U$, where $V \circ V$ denotes the composite of $V$ with itself. The composite of two subsets $V$ and $U$ of $X \times X$ is defined by
  $$V \circ U = \{(x,z) ~:~ \text{ there exists } y \in X \, \text{ such that } \, (x,y) \in U \wedge (y,z) \in V \,\}.$$
5. If $U\in\Phi$ then $U^{-1} \in \Phi,$ where $U^{-1} = \{(y,x) : (x,y)\in U\}$ is the inverse of $U.$

The non-emptiness of $\Phi$ taken together with (2) and (3) states that $\Phi$ is a filter on $X \times X.$ If the last property is omitted we call the space quasiuniform. An element $U$ of $\Phi$ is called a vicinity or entourage from the French word for surroundings.

One usually writes $U[x] = \{y : (x, y) \in U\} = \operatorname{pr}_2(U \cap (\{x\} \times X)\,),$ where $U \cap (\{x\} \times X)$ is the vertical cross section of $U$ and $\operatorname{pr}_2$ is the canonical projection onto the second coordinate. On a graph, a typical entourage is drawn as a blob surrounding the "$y = x$" diagonal; all the different $U[x]$'s form the vertical cross-sections. If $(x, y) \in U$ then one says that $x$ and $y$ are $U$-close. Similarly, if all pairs of points in a subset $A$ of $X$ are $U$-close (that is, if $A \times A$ is contained in $U$), $A$ is called $U$-small. An entourage $U$ is symmetric if $(x, y) \in U$ precisely when $(y, x) \in U$, or equivalently, if $U^{-1} = U$. The first axiom states that each point is $U$-close to itself for each entourage $U.$ The third axiom guarantees that being "both $U$-close and $V$-close" is also a closeness relation in the uniformity. The fourth axiom states that for each entourage $U$ there is an entourage $V$ that is "not more than half as large". Finally, the last axiom states that the property "closeness" with respect to a uniform structure is symmetric in $x$ and $y.$

A base of entourages or fundamental system of entourages (or vicinities) of a uniformity $\Phi$ is any set $\mathcal{B}$ of entourages of $\Phi$ such that every entourage of $\Phi$ contains a set belonging to $\mathcal{B}.$ Thus, by property 2 above, a fundamental systems of entourages $\mathcal{B}$ is enough to specify the uniformity $\Phi$ unambiguously: $\Phi$ is the set of subsets of $X \times X$ that contain a set of $\mathcal{B}.$ Every uniform space has a fundamental system of entourages consisting of symmetric entourages.

Intuition about uniformities is provided by the example of metric spaces: if $(X, d)$ is a metric space, the sets
$$U_a = \{(x,y) \in X \times X : d(x,y) \leq a\} \quad \text{where} \quad a > 0$$
form a fundamental system of entourages for the standard uniform structure of $X.$ Then $x$ and $y$ are $U_a$-close precisely when the distance between $x$ and $y$ is at most $a.$

A uniformity $\Phi$ is finer than another uniformity $\Psi$ on the same set if $\Phi \supseteq \Psi;$ in that case $\Psi$ is said to be coarser than $\Phi.$

=== Pseudometrics definition ===
Uniform spaces may be defined alternatively and equivalently using systems of pseudometrics, an approach that is particularly useful in functional analysis (with pseudometrics provided by seminorms). More precisely, let $f : X \times X \to \R$ be a pseudometric on a set $X.$ The inverse images $U_a = f^{-1}([0, a])$ for $a > 0$ can be shown to form a fundamental system of entourages of a uniformity. The uniformity generated by the $U_a$ is the uniformity defined by the single pseudometric $f.$ Certain authors call spaces the topology of which is defined in terms of pseudometrics gauge spaces.

For a family $\left(f_i\right)$ of pseudometrics on $X,$ the uniform structure defined by the family is the least upper bound of the uniform structures defined by the individual pseudometrics $f_i.$ A fundamental system of entourages of this uniformity is provided by the set of finite intersections of entourages of the uniformities defined by the individual pseudometrics $f_i.$ If the family of pseudometrics is finite, it can be seen that the same uniform structure is defined by a single pseudometric, namely the upper envelope $\sup_{} f_i$ of the family.

Less trivially, it can be shown that a uniform structure that admits a countable fundamental system of entourages (hence in particular a uniformity defined by a countable family of pseudometrics) can be defined by a single pseudometric. A consequence is that any uniform structure can be defined as above by a (possibly uncountable) family of pseudometrics (see Bourbaki: General Topology Chapter IX §1 no. 4).

=== Uniform cover definition ===
A uniform space $(X, \Theta)$ is a set $X$ equipped with a distinguished family of coverings $\Theta,$ called "uniform covers", drawn from the set of coverings of $X,$ that form a filter when ordered by star refinement. One says that a cover $\mathbf{P}$ is a star refinement of cover $\mathbf{Q},$ written $\mathbf{P} <^* \mathbf{Q},$ if for every $A \in \mathbf{P},$ there is a $U \in \mathbf{Q}$ such that if $A \cap B \neq \varnothing,B \in \mathbf{P},$ then $B \subseteq U.$ Axiomatically, the condition of being a filter reduces to:

1. $\{X\}$ is a uniform cover (that is, $\{X\} \in \Theta$).
2. If $\mathbf{P} <^* \mathbf{Q}$ with $\mathbf{P}$ a uniform cover and $\mathbf{Q}$ a cover of $X,$ then $\mathbf{Q}$ is also a uniform cover.
3. If $\mathbf{P}$ and $\mathbf{Q}$ are uniform covers then there is a uniform cover $\mathbf{R}$ that star-refines both $\mathbf{P}$ and $\mathbf{Q}$

Given a point $x$ and a uniform cover $\mathbf{P},$ one can consider the union of the members of $\mathbf{P}$ that contain $x$ as a typical neighbourhood of $x$ of "size" $\mathbf{P},$ and this intuitive measure applies uniformly over the space.

Given a uniform space in the entourage sense, define a cover $\mathbf{P}$ to be uniform if there is some entourage $U$ such that for each $x \in X,$ there is an $A \in \mathbf{P}$ such that $U[x] \subseteq A.$ These uniform covers form a uniform space as in the second definition. Conversely, given a uniform space in the uniform cover sense, the supersets of $\bigcup \{A \times A : A \in \mathbf{P}\},$ as $\mathbf{P}$ ranges over the uniform covers, are the entourages for a uniform space as in the first definition. Moreover, these two transformations are inverses of each other.

== Topology of uniform spaces ==
Every uniform space $X$ becomes a topological space by defining a nonempty subset $O \subseteq X$ to be open if and only if for every $x \in O$ there exists an entourage $V$ such that $V[x]$ is a subset of $O.$ In this topology, the neighbourhood filter of a point $x$ is $\{V[x] : V \in \Phi\}.$ This can be proved with a recursive use of the existence of a "half-size" entourage. Compared to a general topological space the existence of the uniform structure makes possible the comparison of sizes of neighbourhoods: $V[x]$ and $V[y]$ are considered to be of the "same size".

The topology defined by a uniform structure is said to be induced by the uniformity. A uniform structure on a topological space is compatible with the topology if the topology defined by the uniform structure coincides with the original topology. In general several different uniform structures can be compatible with a given topology on $X.$

=== Uniformizable spaces ===
A topological space is called uniformizable if there is a uniform structure compatible with the topology.

Every uniformizable space is a completely regular topological space. Moreover, for a uniformizable space $X$ the following are equivalent:

- $X$ is a Kolmogorov space
- $X$ is a Hausdorff space
- $X$ is a Tychonoff space
- for any compatible uniform structure, the intersection of all entourages is the diagonal $\{(x, x) : x \in X\}.$

Some authors (e.g. Engelking) add this last condition directly in the definition of a uniformizable space.

The topology of a uniformizable space is always a symmetric topology; that is, the space is an R_{0}-space.

Conversely, each completely regular space is uniformizable. A uniformity compatible with the topology of a completely regular space $X$ can be defined as the coarsest uniformity that makes all continuous real-valued functions on $X$ uniformly continuous. A fundamental system of entourages for this uniformity is provided by all finite intersections of sets $(f \times f)^{-1}(V),$ where $f$ is a continuous real-valued function on $X$ and $V$ is an entourage of the uniform space $\mathbf{R}.$ This uniformity defines a topology, which is clearly coarser than the original topology of $X;$ that it is also finer than the original topology (hence coincides with it) is a simple consequence of complete regularity: for any $x \in X$ and a neighbourhood $X$ of $x,$ there is a continuous real-valued function $f$ with $f(x) = 0$ and equal to 1 in the complement of $V.$

In particular, a compact Hausdorff space is uniformizable. In fact, for a compact Hausdorff space $X$ the set of all neighbourhoods of the diagonal in $X \times X$ form the unique uniformity compatible with the topology.

A Hausdorff uniform space is metrizable if its uniformity can be defined by a countable family of pseudometrics. Indeed, as discussed above, such a uniformity can be defined by a single pseudometric, which is necessarily a metric if the space is Hausdorff. In particular, if the topology of a vector space is Hausdorff and definable by a countable family of seminorms, it is metrizable.

== Uniform continuity ==
Similar to continuous functions between topological spaces, which preserve topological properties, are the uniformly continuous functions between uniform spaces, which preserve uniform properties.

A uniformly continuous function is defined as one where inverse images of entourages are again entourages, or equivalently, one where the inverse images of uniform covers are again uniform covers. Explicitly, a function $f : X \to Y$ between uniform spaces is called uniformly continuous if for every entourage $V$ in $Y$ there exists an entourage $U$ in $X$ such that if $\left(x_1, x_2\right) \in U$ then $\left(f\left(x_1\right), f\left(x_2\right)\right) \in V;$ or in other words, whenever $V$ is an entourage in $Y$ then $(f \times f)^{-1}(V)$ is an entourage in $X$, where $f \times f : X \times X \to Y \times Y$ is defined by $(f \times f)\left(x_1, x_2\right) = \left(f\left(x_1\right), f\left(x_2\right)\right).$

All uniformly continuous functions are continuous with respect to the induced topologies.

Uniform spaces with uniform maps form a category. An isomorphism between uniform spaces is called a uniform isomorphism; explicitly, it is a uniformly continuous bijection whose inverse is also uniformly continuous. A uniform embedding is an injective uniformly continuous map $i : X \to Y$ between uniform spaces whose inverse $i^{-1} : i(X) \to X$ is also uniformly continuous, where the image $i(X)$ has the subspace uniformity inherited from $Y.$

== Completeness ==
Generalizing the notion of complete metric space, one can also define completeness for uniform spaces. Instead of working with Cauchy sequences, one works with Cauchy filters (or Cauchy nets).

A Cauchy filter (respectively, a Cauchy prefilter) on a uniform space $X$ is a filter (respectively, a prefilter) $F$ such that for every entourage $U,$ there exists $A \in F$ with $A \times A \subseteq U.$ In other words, a filter is Cauchy if it contains "arbitrarily small" sets. It follows from the definitions that each filter that converges (with respect to the topology defined by the uniform structure) is a Cauchy filter. A minimal Cauchy filter is a Cauchy filter that does not contain any smaller (that is, coarser) Cauchy filter (other than itself). It can be shown that every Cauchy filter contains a unique minimal Cauchy filter. The neighbourhood filter of each point (the filter consisting of all neighbourhoods of the point) is a minimal Cauchy filter.

Conversely, a uniform space is called complete if every Cauchy filter converges. Any compact Hausdorff space is a complete uniform space with respect to the unique uniformity compatible with the topology.

Complete uniform spaces enjoy the following important property: if $f : A \to Y$ is a uniformly continuous function from a dense subset $A$ of a uniform space $X$ into a complete uniform space $Y,$ then $f$ can be extended (uniquely) into a uniformly continuous function on all of $X.$

A topological space that can be made into a complete uniform space, whose uniformity induces the original topology, is called a completely uniformizable space.

A completion of a uniform space $X$ is a pair $(i, C)$ consisting of a complete uniform space $C$ and a uniform embedding $i : X \to C$ whose image $i(X)$ is a dense subset of $C.$

=== Hausdorff completion of a uniform space ===
As with metric spaces, every uniform space $X$ has a Hausdorff completion: that is, there exists a complete Hausdorff uniform space $Y$ and a uniformly continuous map $i : X \to Y$ (if $X$ is a Hausdorff uniform space then $i$ is a topological embedding) with the following property:

for any uniformly continuous mapping $f$ of $X$ into a complete Hausdorff uniform space $Z,$ there is a unique uniformly continuous map $g : Y \to Z$ such that $f = g i.$

The Hausdorff completion $Y$ is unique up to isomorphism. As a set, $Y$ can be taken to consist of the minimal Cauchy filters on $X.$ As the neighbourhood filter $\mathbf{B}(x)$ of each point $x$ in $X$ is a minimal Cauchy filter, the map $i$ can be defined by mapping $x$ to $\mathbf{B}(x).$ The map $i$ thus defined is in general not injective; in fact, the graph of the equivalence relation $i(x) = i(x')$ is the intersection of all entourages of $X,$ and thus $i$ is injective precisely when $X$ is Hausdorff.

The uniform structure on $Y$ is defined as follows: for each symmetric entourage $V$ (that is, such that $(x, y) \in V$ implies $(y, x) \in V$), let $C(V)$ be the set of all pairs $(F, G)$ of minimal Cauchy filters which have in common at least one $V$-small set. The sets $C(V)$ can be shown to form a fundamental system of entourages; $Y$ is equipped with the uniform structure thus defined.

The set $i(X)$ is then a dense subset of $Y.$ If $X$ is Hausdorff, then $i$ is an isomorphism onto $i(X),$ and thus $X$ can be identified with a dense subset of its completion. Moreover, $i(X)$ is always Hausdorff; it is called the Hausdorff uniform space associated with $X.$ If $R$ denotes the equivalence relation $i(x) = i(x'),$ then the quotient space $X / R$ is homeomorphic to $i(X).$

== Examples ==
1. Every metric space $(M, d)$ can be considered as a uniform space. Indeed, since a metric is a fortiori a pseudometric, the pseudometric definition furnishes $M$ with a uniform structure. A fundamental system of entourages of this uniformity is provided by the sets
  $\qquad U_a \triangleq d^{-1}([0,a]) = \{(m, n) \in M \times M : d(m,n) \leq a\}.$
  This uniform structure on $M$ generates the usual metric space topology on $M.$ However, different metric spaces can have the same uniform structure (trivial example is provided by a constant multiple of a metric). This uniform structure produces also equivalent definitions of uniform continuity and completeness for metric spaces.
2. Using metrics, a simple example of distinct uniform structures with coinciding topologies can be constructed. For instance, let $d_1(x, y) = |x - y|$ be the usual metric on $\R$ and let $d_2(x, y) = \left|e^x - e^y\right|.$ Then both metrics induce the usual topology on $\R,$ yet the uniform structures are distinct, since $\{(x, y) : |x - y| < 1\}$ is an entourage in the uniform structure for $d_1(x, y)$ but not for $d_2(x, y).$ Informally, this example can be seen as taking the usual uniformity and distorting it through the action of a continuous yet non-uniformly continuous function.
3. Every topological group $G$ (in particular, every topological vector space) becomes a uniform space if we define a subset $V \subseteq G \times G$ to be an entourage if and only if it contains the set $\{(x, y) : x \cdot y^{-1} \in U\}$ for some neighborhood $U$ of the identity element of $G.$ This uniform structure on $G$ is called the right uniformity on $G,$ because for every $a \in G,$ the right multiplication $x \to x \cdot a$ is uniformly continuous with respect to this uniform structure. One may also define a left uniformity on $G;$ the two need not coincide, but they both generate the given topology on $G.$
4. For every topological group $G$ and its subgroup $H \subseteq G$ the set of left cosets $G / H$ is a uniform space with respect to the uniformity $\Phi$ defined as follows. The sets $\tilde{U} = \{(s,t) \in G/H \times G/H : \ \ t \in U \cdot s\},$ where $U$ runs over neighborhoods of the identity in $G,$ form a fundamental system of entourages for the uniformity $\Phi.$ The corresponding induced topology on $G / H$ is equal to the quotient topology defined by the natural map $G \to G / H.$
5. The trivial topology belongs to a uniform space in which the whole cartesian product $X \times X$ is the only entourage.

== History ==
Before André Weil gave the first explicit definition of a uniform structure in 1937, uniform concepts, like completeness, were discussed using metric spaces. Nicolas Bourbaki provided the definition of uniform structure in terms of entourages in the book Topologie Générale and John Tukey gave the uniform cover definition. Weil also characterized uniform spaces in terms of a family of pseudometrics.

== See also ==
- Coarse structure – Concept in geometry and topology
- Complete metric space – Metric geometry
- Complete topological vector space – Structure in functional analysis
- Completely uniformizable space
- Filters in topology – Application of set theory concept
- Initial uniform structure – Coarsest topology making certain functions continuous
- Proximity space – Structure describing a notion of "nearness" between subsets
- Space (mathematics) – Mathematical set with some added structure
- Topology of uniform convergence
- Uniform continuity – Uniform restraint of the change in functions
- Uniform isomorphism – Uniformly continuous homeomorphism
- Uniform property – Object of study in the category of uniform topological spaces
- Uniformly connected space – Type of uniform space
