= Lindelöf (surname) =

Lindelöf is a surname of Swedish origin which may refer to:

== People ==
- Bernt Lindelöf (born 1945), Swedish sprint canoeist
- Damon Lindelof (born 1973), American screenwriter and producer
- Ernst Leonard Lindelöf (1870–1946), Finnish mathematician
- Helmi Lindelöf (1884–1966), Finnish actress
- Henri Lindelöf, Swedish sprint canoeist
- Lorenz Leonard Lindelöf (1827–1908), Finnish mathematician and astronomer
- Oscar Lindelöf (1903–1993), Swedish wrestler
- Uno Lindelöf (1868–1944), Finnish linguist and politician
- Victor Lindelöf (born 1994), Swedish footballer

== Other ==
- Lindelöf hypothesis, a mathematical conjecture
- Lindelöf's lemma, a mathematical terminology in topology
- Lindelöf space, a mathematical property of topological spaces
- Lindelöf's theorem, a mathematical theorem within complex analysis
- Phragmén–Lindelöf principle, a mathematical principle
- Picard–Lindelöf theorem, a mathematical theorem in the study of differential equations
- 1407 Lindelöf, a main belt asteroid with an orbital period of 1676.6949325 days
