= Hurewicz space =

In mathematics, a Hurewicz space is a topological space that satisfies a certain basic selection principle that generalizes σ-compactness. A Hurewicz space is a space in which for every sequence of open covers $\mathcal{U}_1, \mathcal{U}_2, \ldots$ of the space there are finite sets $\mathcal{F}_1 \subset \mathcal{U}_1, \mathcal{F}_2 \subset \mathcal{U}_2, \ldots$ such that every point of the space belongs to all but finitely many sets $\bigcup\mathcal{F}_1, \bigcup\mathcal{F}_2,\ldots$ .

== History ==
In 1926, Witold Hurewicz introduced the above property of topological spaces that is formally stronger than the Menger property. He didn't know whether Menger's conjecture is true, and whether his property is strictly stronger than the Menger property, but he conjectured that in the class of metric spaces his property is equivalent to $\sigma$-compactness.

== Hurewicz's conjecture ==
Hurewicz conjectured that in ZFC every Hurewicz metric space is σ-compact. Just, Miller, Scheepers, and Szeptycki proved that Hurewicz's conjecture is false, by showing that there is, in ZFC, a set of real numbers that is Menger but not σ-compact. Their proof was dichotomic, and the set witnessing the failure of the conjecture heavily depends on whether a certain (undecidable) axiom holds or not.

Bartoszyński and Shelah (see also Tsaban's solution based on their work ) gave a uniform ZFC example of a Hurewicz subset of the real line that is not σ-compact.

== Hurewicz's problem ==
Hurewicz asked whether in ZFC his property is strictly stronger than the Menger property. In 2002, Chaber and Pol in unpublished note, using dichotomy proof, showed that there is a Hurewicz subset of the real line that is not Menger. In 2008, Tsaban and Zdomskyy gave a uniform example of a Hurewicz subset of the real line that is Menger but not Hurewicz.

== Characterizations ==
=== Combinatorial characterization ===
For subsets of the real line, the Hurewicz property can be characterized using continuous functions into the Baire space $\mathbb{N}^\mathbb{N}$. For functions $f,g\in \mathbb{N}^\mathbb{N}$, write $f\leq^* g$ if $f(n)\leq g(n)$ for all but finitely many natural numbers $n$. A subset $A$ of $\mathbb{N}^\mathbb{N}$ is bounded if there is a function $g\in \mathbb{N}^\mathbb{N}$such that $f\leq^* g$ for all functions $f\in A$. A subset of $\mathbb{N}^\mathbb{N}$ is unbounded if it is not bounded. Hurewicz proved that a subset of the real line is Hurewicz iff every continuous image of that space into the Baire space is unbounded. In particular, every subset of the real line of cardinality less than the bounding number $\mathfrak{b}$ is Hurewicz.

=== Topological game characterization ===
Let $X$ be a topological space. The Hurewicz game played on $X$ is a game with two players Alice and Bob.

1st round: Alice chooses an open cover $\mathcal{U}_1$ of $X$. Bob chooses a finite set $\mathcal{F}_1\subset \mathcal{U}_1$.

2nd round: Alice chooses an open cover $\mathcal{U}_2$ of $X$. Bob chooses a finite set $\mathcal{F}_2\subset \mathcal{U}_2$.

etc.

If every point of the space $X$ belongs to all but finitely many sets $\bigcup\mathcal{F}_1, \bigcup\mathcal{F}_2,\ldots$ , then Bob wins the Hurewicz game. Otherwise, Alice wins.

A player has a winning strategy if he knows how to play in order to win the game (formally, a winning strategy is a function).

A topological space is Hurewicz iff Alice has no winning strategy in the Hurewicz game played on this space.

=== $G_\delta$-neighborhood characterization ===
A Tychonoff space $X$ is Hurewicz iff for every compact space $C$ containing the space $X$, and a $G_\delta$ subset G of $C$ containing the space $X$, there is a $\sigma$-compact set $Y$ with $X\subset Y\subset G$.

== Properties ==
- Every compact, and even σ-compact, space is Hurewicz.
- Every Hurewicz space is a Menger space, and thus it is a Lindelöf space
- Continuous image of a Hurewicz space is Hurewicz
- The Hurewicz property is closed under taking $F_\sigma$ subsets
- Hurewicz's property characterizes filters whose Mathias forcing notion does not add unbounded functions.
