= Γ-space =

Topological space

In mathematics, a $\gamma$-space (gamma space) is a topological space that satisfies a certain basic selection principle. An infinite cover of a topological space is an $\omega$-cover if every finite subset of this space is contained in some member of the cover, and the whole space is not a member the cover. A cover of a topological space is a $\gamma$-cover if every point of this space belongs to all but finitely many members of this cover. A $\gamma$-space is a space in which every open $\omega$-cover contains a $\gamma$-cover.

== History ==
Gerlits and Nagy introduced the notion of γ-spaces. They listed some topological properties and enumerated them by Greek letters. The above property was the third one on this list, and therefore it is called the γ-property.

== Characterizations ==
=== Combinatorial characterization ===
Let $[\mathbb{N}]^\infty$ be the set of all infinite subsets of the set of natural numbers. A set $A\subset [\mathbb{N}]^\infty$ is centered if the intersection of finitely many elements of $A$ is infinite. Every set $a\in[\mathbb{N}]^\infty$ we identify with its increasing enumeration, and thus the set $a$ we can treat as a member of the Baire space $\mathbb{N}^\mathbb{N}$. Therefore, $[\mathbb{N}]^\infty$ is a topological space as a subspace of the Baire space $\mathbb{N}^\mathbb{N}$. A zero-dimensional separable metric space is a γ-space if and only if every continuous image of that space into the space $[\mathbb{N}]^\infty$ that is centered has a pseudointersection.

=== Topological game characterization ===
Let $X$ be a topological space. The $\gamma$-has a pseudo intersection if there is a set game played on $X$ is a game with two players Alice and Bob.

1st round: Alice chooses an open $\omega$-cover $\mathcal{U}_1$ of $X$. Bob chooses a set $U_1\in \mathcal{U}_1$.

2nd round: Alice chooses an open $\omega$-cover $\mathcal{U}_2$ of $X$. Bob chooses a set $U_2\in \mathcal{U}_2$.

etc.

If $\{U_n:n\in\mathbb{N}\}$ is a $\gamma$-cover of the space $X$, then Bob wins the game. Otherwise, Alice wins.

A player has a winning strategy if he knows how to play in order to win the game (formally, a winning strategy is a function).

A topological space is a $\gamma$-space iff Alice has no winning strategy in the $\gamma$-game played on this space.

== Properties ==
- A topological space is a γ-space if and only if it satisfies $\text{S}_1(\Omega,\Gamma)$ selection principle.
- Every Lindelöf space of cardinality less than the pseudointersection number $\mathfrak{p}$ is a $\gamma$-space.
- Every $\gamma$-space is a Rothberger space, and thus it has strong measure zero.
- Let $X$ be a Tychonoff space, and $C(X)$ be the space of continuous functions $f\colon X\to\mathbb{R}$ with pointwise convergence topology. The space $X$ is a $\gamma$-space if and only if $C(X)$ is Fréchet–Urysohn if and only if $C(X)$ is strong Fréchet–Urysohn.
- Let $A$ be a $\binom{\mathbf{\Omega}}{\mathbf{\Gamma}}$ subset of the real line, and $M$ be a meager subset of the real line. Then the set $A+M=\{a+x:a\in A, x\in M\}$ is meager.
