= Finnish Mathematical Society =

Mathematical society in Finland

- Suomen Matemaattinen Yhdistys
- Abbreviation: FMS, SMY
- Formation: 20 November 1868; 157 years ago
- Type: Mathematical society
- Headquarters: University of Helsinki
- Location: Finland
- President: Pekka Pankka
- Awards: Dissertation Prize; Lindelöf Prize; Mathematics Prize of the FMS
- Website: matemaattinenyhdistys.fi

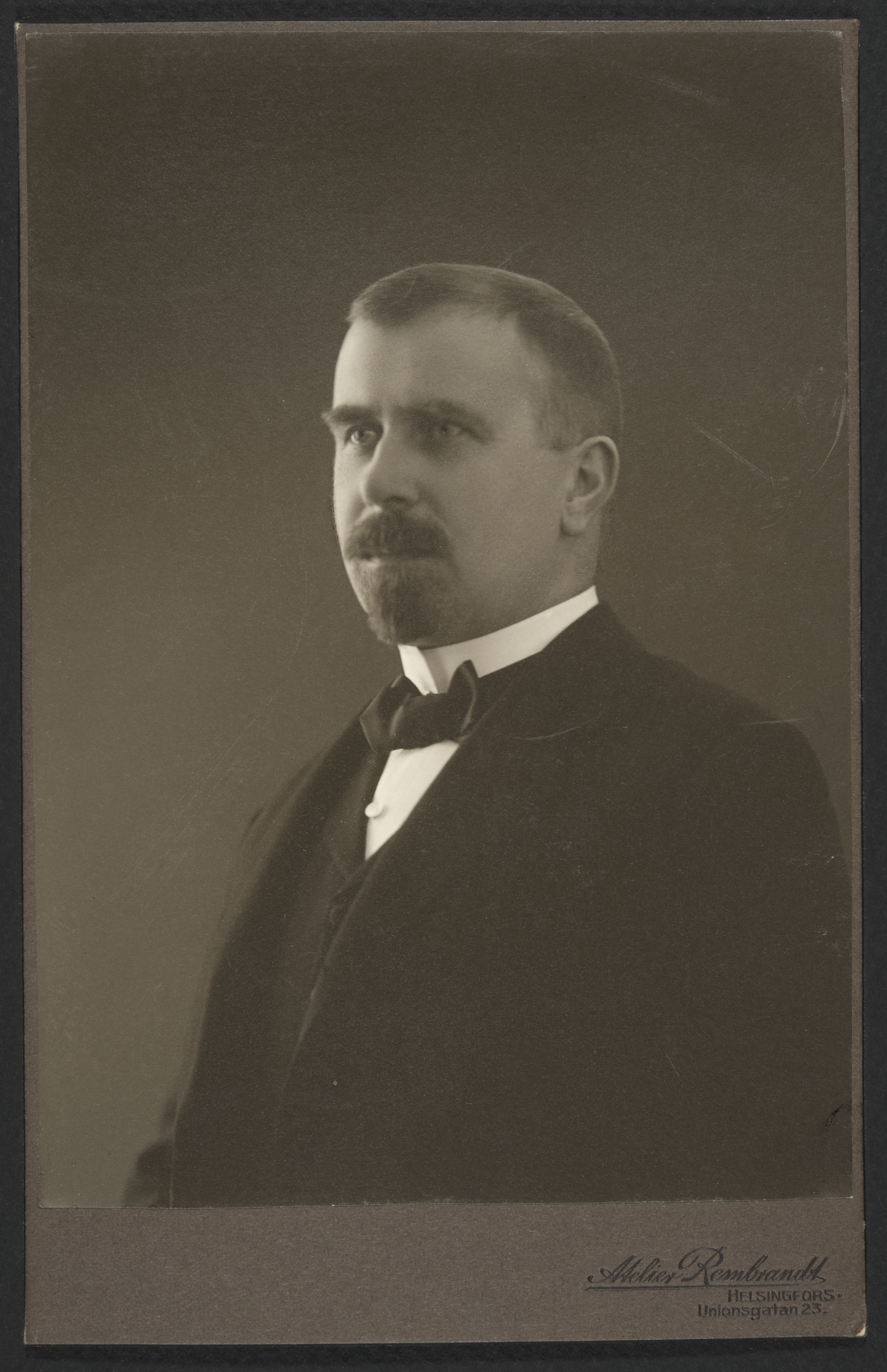
Ernst Lindelöf (pictured in 1914) was president of the FMS from 1903 for over four decades.

The Finnish Mathematical Society or FMS (Finnish: Suomen Matemaattinen Yhdistys, SMY) is a mathematical society founded in Finland in November 1868, making it one of the oldest in the world. The FMS is based in Helsinki, and is a founding member of the European Mathematical Society. It is recognised by the International Mathematics Union.

== History ==
The Finnish Mathematical Society was founded on 20 November 1868, when Finland was a Grand Duchy of the Russian Empire. The first president of the Finnish Mathematical Society was Lorenz Lindelöf, a professor at University of Helsinki, which at the time had the only mathematics department in Finland. At first the official language of the FMS was Swedish, but over time it was replaced by Finnish.

Student organisations were forbidden in Finland from 1852 to 1868 and replaced with "student faculties", which were led by professors. The activities of the Finnish Mathematical Society were at first guided by its origins in the student faculties, and its early meetings were mostly didactic. In 1892 new statutes were introduced and the society's focus shifted towards research rather than teaching. Marcel Riesz was the first foreign speaker at a meeting of the FMS in 1926. In time the society came to see hosting international mathematicians as one of its main activities, and by 1999 some 30 were visiting per year.

The Second World War prompted Ernst Lindelöf – who had been president of the FMS since 1903 – to retire, and prominent mathematicians Lars Ahlfors and Rolf Nevanlinna to leave Finland. Finland had to pay war reparations to the Soviet Union, and the damage this caused to the economy also affected the functioning of the society. The Finnish research environment improved in the 1960s and 1970s, and in 1978 the International Congress of Mathematicians was held in Helsinki. At this meeting the European Mathematical Council, the predecessor of the European Mathematical Society, was founded.

== Publications ==
The Finnish Mathematical Society publishes:

- The journal Annales Fennici Mathematici, which was previously called Annales Academiæ Scientiarum Fennicæ Mathematica. The journal is indexed by zbMath.
- The bulletin Arkhimedes, jointly with two Finnish physical societies.
- The journal Mathematica Scadinavica, jointly with other Nordic mathematical societies.
- The magazine Matematiikkalehti Solmu, which is distributed in Finnish schools.

== Prizes ==
The Finnish Mathematical Society awards three prizes. Its Disseration Prize (Finnish: Väitöskirjapalkinto) is awarded annually since 2019 for the best mathematics Ph.D. thesis in Finland, and is supported by the Olli Lehto memorial fund. Since 1991 the Lindelöf Prize is awarded annually for the best mathematics Master's Thesis in Finland; until 2002 the thesis had to have been from the University of Helsinki. The Mathematics Prize of the FMS (Finnish: SMYn Matematiikkapalkinto) has been awarded biennially since 2004 for "the wider promotion of mathematics."

== Presidents ==
Past presidents of the Society include:

- Lorenz Lindelöf
- Edvard Rudolf Neovius
- Ernst Lindelöf
- Pekka Juhana Myrberg
- Antti Kupiainen
- Eero Saksman

Ernst Lindelöf was president for over four decades. Under current rules, a president of the FMS can serve at most 5 years.

== See also ==
- List of mathematical societies
