= Hadamard three-circle theorem =

Theorem in complex analysis

In complex analysis, a branch of mathematics, the Hadamard three-circle theorem is a result about the behavior of holomorphic functions.

== Statement ==
Hadamard three-circle theorem: Let $f(z)$ be a holomorphic function on the annulus $r_1\leq\left| z\right| \leq r_3$. Let $M(r)$ be the maximum of $|f(z)|$ on the circle $|z|=r.$ Then, $\log M(r)$ is a convex function of the logarithm $\log (r).$ Moreover, if $f(z)$ is not of the form $cz^\lambda$ for some constants $\lambda$ and $c$, then $\log M(r)$ is strictly convex as a function of $\log (r).$

The conclusion of the theorem can be restated as

$$\log\left(\frac{r_3}{r_1}\right)\log M(r_2)\leq
\log\left(\frac{r_3}{r_2}\right)\log M(r_1)
+\log\left(\frac{r_2}{r_1}\right)\log M(r_3)$$

for any three concentric circles of radii $r_1<r_2<r_3.$

== Proof ==
The three circles theorem follows from the fact that for any real a, the function Re log(z^{a}f(z)) is harmonic between two circles, and therefore takes its maximum value on one of the circles. The theorem follows by choosing the constant a so that this harmonic function has the same maximum value on both circles.

The theorem can also be deduced directly from Hadamard's three-line theorem.

== History ==
A statement and proof for the theorem was given by J.E. Littlewood in 1912, but he attributes it to no one in particular, stating it as a known theorem. Harald Bohr and Edmund Landau attribute the theorem to Jacques Hadamard, writing in 1896; Hadamard published no proof.

== See also ==
- Maximum principle
- Logarithmically convex function
- Hardy's theorem
- Hadamard three-line theorem
- Borel–Carathéodory theorem
- Phragmén–Lindelöf principle
