= Exhaustion by compact sets =

In mathematics, especially general topology and analysis, an exhaustion by compact sets of a topological space $X$ is a nested sequence of compact subsets $K_i$ of $X$ (i.e. $K_1\subseteq K_2\subseteq K_3\subseteq\cdots$), such that each $K_i$ is contained in the interior of $K_{i+1}$, i.e. $K_i\subset\text{int}(K_{i+1})$, and $X=\bigcup_{i=1}^\infty K_i$.

A space admitting an exhaustion by compact sets is called exhaustible by compact sets.

As an example, for the space $X=\mathbb{R}^n$, the sequence of closed balls $K_i = \{ x : |x| \le i \}$ forms an exhaustion of the space by compact sets.

There is a weaker condition that drops the requirement that $K_i$ is in the interior of $K_{i+1}$, meaning the space is σ-compact (i.e., a countable union of compact subsets.)

== Construction ==
If there is an exhaustion by compact sets, the space is necessarily locally compact (if Hausdorff). The converse is also often true. For example, for a locally compact Hausdorff space $X$ that is a countable union of compact subsets, we can construct an exhaustion as follows. We write $X = \bigcup_1^{\infty} K_n$ as a union of compact sets $K_n$. Then inductively choose open sets $V_n \supset \overline{V_{n-1}} \cup K_n$ with compact closures, where $V_0 = \emptyset$. Then $\overline{V_n}$ is a required exhaustion.

For a locally compact Hausdorff space that is second-countable, a similar argument can be used to construct an exhaustion.

== Application ==
For a Hausdorff space $X$, an exhaustion by compact sets can be used to show the space is paracompact. Indeed, suppose we have an increasing sequence $V_1 \subset V_2 \subset \cdots$ of open subsets such that $X = \bigcup V_n$ and each $\overline{V_n}$ is compact and is contained in $V_{n+1}$. Let $\mathcal{U}$ be an open cover of $X$. We also let $V_n = \emptyset, \, n \le 0$. Then, for each $n \ge 1$, $\{ (V_{n + 1} - \overline{V_{n-2}}) \cap U \mid U \in \mathcal{U} \}$ is an open cover of the compact set $\overline{V_n} - V_{n-1}$ and thus admits a finite subcover $\mathcal{V}_n$. Then $\mathcal{V} := \bigcup_{n=1}^{\infty} \mathcal{V}_n$ is a locally finite refinement of $\mathcal{U}.$

Remark: The proof in fact shows that each open cover admits a countable refinement consisting of open sets with compact closures and each of whose members intersects only finitely many others.

The following type of converse also holds. A paracompact locally compact Hausdorff space with countably many open connected components is a countable union of compact sets and thus admits an exhaustion by compact subsets.

== Relation to other properties ==
The following are equivalent for a topological space $X$:

1. $X$ is exhaustible by compact sets.
2. $X$ is σ-compact and weakly locally compact.
3. $X$ is Lindelöf and weakly locally compact.

(where weakly locally compact means locally compact in the weak sense that each point has a compact neighborhood).

The hemicompact property is intermediate between exhaustible by compact sets and σ-compact. Every space exhaustible by compact sets is hemicompact and every hemicompact space is σ-compact, but the reverse implications do not hold. For example, the Arens-Fort space and the Appert space are hemicompact, but not exhaustible by compact sets (because not weakly locally compact), and the set $\Q$ of rational numbers with the usual topology is σ-compact, but not hemicompact.

Every regular Hausdorff space that is a countable union of compact sets is paracompact.
