= 1407 Lindelöf =

Asteroid

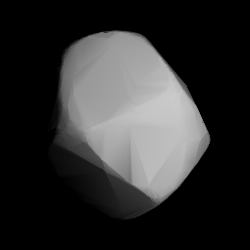
- Shape model of Lindelöf from its lightcurve

Discovery
- Discovered by: Y. Väisälä
- Discovery site: Turku Obs.
- Discovery date: 21 November 1936

Designations
- Named after: Ernst Lindelöf (Finnish topologist)
- Alternative designations: 1936 WC · 1977 FL; A905 AB
- Minor planet category: main-belt · (middle)

Orbital characteristics
- Epoch 4 September 2017 (JD 2458000.5)
- Uncertainty parameter 0
- Observation arc: 112.51 yr (41,093 days)
- Aphelion: 3.5462 AU
- Perihelion: 1.9853 AU
- Semi-major axis: 2.7657 AU
- Eccentricity: 0.2822
- Orbital period (sidereal): 4.60 yr (1,680 days)
- Mean anomaly: 231.44°
- Mean motion: 0° 12^{m} 51.48^{s} / day
- Inclination: 5.8138°
- Longitude of ascending node: 268.39°
- Argument of perihelion: 111.03°

Physical characteristics
- Dimensions: 17.39±3.36 km 19.94±3.96 km 20.310±0.317 km 20.75 km (derived); 20.98±1.6 km 23.85±1.40 km
- Synodic rotation period: 31.0941±0.0001 h 31.151±0.004 h
- Geometric albedo: 0.179±0.023; 0.1791 (derived); 0.187±0.017; 0.21±0.06; 0.2309±0.040; 0.28±0.17
- Spectral type: SMASS = X · S
- Absolute magnitude (H): 10.6 · 10.67±0.40 · 10.9 · 10.96

1407 Lindelöf (provisional designation 1936 WC) is an asteroid from the central region of the asteroid belt, approximately 20 kilometers in diameter. It was discovered on 21 November 1936 by Finnish astronomer Yrjö Väisälä at Turku Observatory in Southwest Finland. The asteroid was named after Finnish topologist Ernst Lindelöf.

== Orbit and classification ==
Lindelöf orbits the Sun in the central main asteroid belt at a distance of 2.0–3.5 AU once every 4 years and 7 months (1,680 days). Its orbit has an orbital eccentricity of 0.28 and an inclination of 6° with respect to the ecliptic. In 1905, it was first identified as A905 AB at Heidelberg Observatory, extending the body's observation arc by 31 years prior to its official discovery observation.

== Physical characteristics ==
In the SMASS taxonomy, Lindelöf's spectral class is that of an X-type asteroid, while the Collaborative Asteroid Lightcurve Link (CALL) considers it to be of a stony composition.

=== Rotation period and poles ===
French amateur astronomer Pierre Antonini obtained a rotational lightcurve of Lindelöf from photometric observations in January 2006. Lightcurve analysis gave a well-defined and longer-than average rotation period of 31.151 hours with a brightness variation of 0.34 in magnitude (U=3).

A lightcurve published in 2016 using modeled photometric data from the Lowell Photometric Database (LPD) gave a concurring period of 31.0941 hours (U/Q=n.a.), as well as a spin axis of (147.0°, 36°) in ecliptic coordinates (λ, β).

=== Diameter and albedo ===
According to the surveys carried out by the Infrared Astronomical Satellite (IRAS), the Japanese AKARI satellite, and NASA's Wide-field Infrared Survey Explorer with its subsequent NEOWISE mission, Lindelöf measures between 17.39 and 23.85 kilometres (10.81 and 14.82 mi) in diameter, and its surface has an albedo between and 0.179 and 0.28. The Collaborative Asteroid Lightcurve Link derives an albedo of 0.1791 and a diameter of 20.75 kilometres (12.89 mi), with an absolute magnitude of 10.9.

== Naming ==
This minor planet was named for Finnish topologist Ernst Leonard Lindelöf (1870–1946), who was a professor of mathematics at Helsinki University. The Lindelöf spaces are also named after him. The official naming citation was mentioned in The Names of the Minor Planets by Paul Herget in 1955 (H 127).
