= Menger space =

In mathematics, a Menger space is a topological space that satisfies a certain basic selection principle that generalizes σ-compactness. A Menger space is a space in which for every sequence of open covers $\mathcal{U}_1, \mathcal{U}_2, \ldots$ of the space there are finite sets $\mathcal{F}_1 \subset \mathcal{U}_1, \mathcal{F}_2 \subset \mathcal{U}_2, \ldots$ such that the family $\mathcal{F}_1 \cup \mathcal{F}_2 \cup \cdots$ covers the space.

== History ==
In 1924, Karl Menger introduced the following basis property for metric spaces: Every basis of the topology contains a countable family of sets with vanishing diameters that covers the space. Soon thereafter, Witold Hurewicz observed that Menger's basis property can be reformulated to the above form using sequences of open covers.

== Menger's conjecture ==
Menger conjectured that in ZFC every Menger metric space is σ-compact. A. W. Miller and D. H. Fremlin proved that Menger's conjecture is false, by showing that there is, in ZFC, a set of real numbers that is Menger but not σ-compact. The Fremlin-Miller proof was dichotomic, and the set witnessing the failure of the conjecture heavily depends on whether a certain (undecidable) axiom holds or not.

Bartoszyński and Tsaban gave a uniform ZFC example of a Menger subset of the real line that is not σ-compact.

== Combinatorial characterization ==
For subsets of the real line, the Menger property can be characterized using continuous functions into the Baire space $\mathbb{N}^\mathbb{N}$. For functions $f,g\in \mathbb{N}^\mathbb{N}$, write $f\leq^* g$ if $f(n)\leq g(n)$ for all but finitely many natural numbers $n$. A subset $A$ of $\mathbb{N}^\mathbb{N}$ is dominating if for each function $f\in\mathbb{N}^\mathbb{N}$ there is a function $g\in A$ such that $f\leq^* g$. Hurewicz proved that a subset of the real line is Menger iff every continuous image of that space into the Baire space is not dominating. In particular, every subset of the real line of cardinality less than the dominating number $\mathfrak{d}$ is Menger.

The cardinality of Bartoszyński and Tsaban's counter-example to Menger's conjecture is $\mathfrak{d}$.

== Properties ==
- Every compact, and even σ-compact, space is Menger.
- Every Menger space is a Lindelöf space
- Continuous image of a Menger space is Menger
- The Menger property is closed under taking $F_\sigma$ subsets
- Menger's property characterizes filters whose Mathias forcing notion does not add dominating functions.
