= Hemicompact space =

Concept in mathematical topology

In mathematics, in the field of topology, a Hausdorff topological space is said to be hemicompact if it has a sequence of compact subsets such that every compact subset of the space lies inside some compact set in the sequence. This forces the union of the sequence to be the whole space, because every point is compact and hence must lie in one of the compact sets.

== Examples ==
- Every compact space is hemicompact.
- The real line is hemicompact.
- Every locally compact Lindelöf space is hemicompact.

== Properties ==
Every hemicompact space is σ-compact and if in addition it is first countable then it is locally compact. If a hemicompact space is weakly locally compact, then it is exhaustible by compact sets.

== Applications ==
If $X$ is a hemicompact space, then the space $C(X, M)$ of all continuous functions $f : X \to M$ to a metric space $(M, \delta)$ with the compact-open topology is metrizable. To see this, take a sequence $K_1,K_2,\dots$ of compact subsets of $X$ such that every compact subset of $X$ lies inside some compact set in this sequence (the existence of such a sequence follows from the hemicompactness of $X$). Define pseudometrics

$$d_n (f,g) = \sup_{x \in K_n} \delta\bigl( f(x), g(x) \bigr), \quad f,g \in C(X,M), n \in \mathbb{N}.$$

Then

$$d(f,g) = \sum_{n=1}^{\infty} \frac{1}{2^n} \cdot \frac{d_n (f,g)}{1+d_n (f,g)}$$

defines a metric on $C(X,M)$ which induces the compact-open topology.

== See also ==
- Compact space
- Exhaustible by compact sets
- Locally compact space
- Lindelöf space
