= D-space =

In mathematics, a D-space is a topological space where for every neighborhood assignment of that space, a cover can be created from the union of neighborhoods from the neighborhood assignment of some closed discrete subset of the space.

== Definition ==
An open neighborhood assignment is a function that assigns an open neighborhood to each element in the set. More formally, given a topological space $X$. An open neighborhood assignment is a function $f: X \to N(X)$ where $f(x)$ is an open neighborhood.

A topological space $X$ is a D-space if for every given neighborhood assignment $N_x : X \to N(X)$, there exists a closed discrete subset $D$ of the space $X$ such that $\bigcup_{x\in D}N_x=X$.

== History ==
The notion of D-spaces was introduced by Eric Karel van Douwen and E.A. Michael. It first appeared in a 1979 paper by van Douwen and Washek Frantisek Pfeffer in the Pacific Journal of Mathematics. Whether every Lindelöf and regular topological space is a D-space is known as the D-space problem. This problem is among twenty of the most important problems of set theoretic topology.

== Properties ==
- Every Menger space is a D-space.
- A subspace of a topological linearly ordered space is a D-space iff it is a paracompact space.
