= Olli Lehto =

Finnish mathematician (1925–2020)

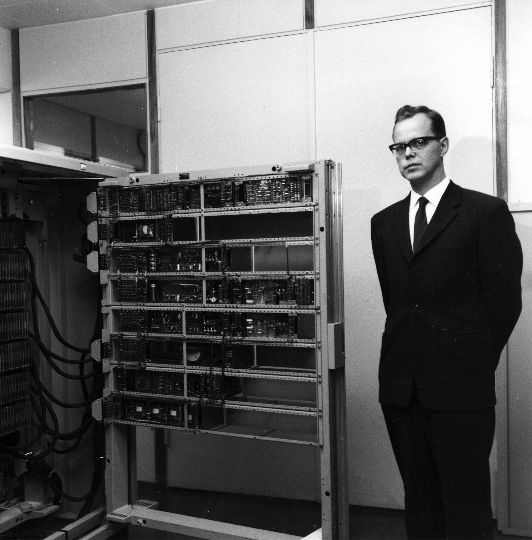
Olli Lehto with a computer in 1962.

Olli Erkki Lehto (30 May 1925 in Helsinki — 31 December 2020) was a Finnish mathematician, specializing in geometric function theory, and a chancellor of the University of Helsinki.

Lehto earned his PhD in 1949 from the University of Helsinki under Rolf Nevanlinna with thesis Anwendung orthogonaler Systeme auf gewisse funktionentheoretische Extremal- und Abbildungsprobleme. At the University of Helsinki, Lehto was from 1961 to 1988 a professor, from 1978 the dean of science, from 1983 the rector, and from 1988 to 1993 the chancellor.

From 1983 to 1990 he was Secretary of the International Mathematical Union. In 1962 he became a member of the Finnish Academy of Science and Letters (Suomalainen Tiedeakatemia). In 1968 he was elected member of the Finnish Society of Sciences and Letters and in 1988 he became honorary member of the same society. He was a member of the Norwegian Academy of Science and Letters from 1986. In 1975 he was given by the President of Finland the honorary title "Academician of Science" (Tieteen akateemikko). Lehto was the chief organizer of the International Congress of Mathematicians (ICM) in Helsinki in 1978 and an invited speaker of the ICM in Moscow in 1966 with lecture Quasiconformal mappings in the plane. He was elected a Fellow of the American Mathematical Society.

In 2001 Lehto published a biography of his mentor Rolf Nevanlinna.

== Selected works ==
- with Kaarlo Virtanen: Quasikonforme Abbildungen. Springer 1965, Grundlehren der Mathematischen Wissenschaften, 2nd edition: Quasiconformal mappings in the plane. Springer 1973.
- Univalent functions and Teichmüller Spaces. Springer, Graduate Texts in Mathematics, 1987.
- Mathematics without borders: a history of the International Mathematical Union. Verlag-Springer. 1998. ISBN 978-0-387-98358-5.
- Lehto, Olli (2001). Korkeat maailmat: Rolf Nevanlinnan elämä [High Worlds: The life of Rolf Nevanlinna] (in Finnish). Otava. OCLC 58345155.
  - Lehto, Olli (2008). Erhabene Welten: Das Leben Rolf Nevanlinnas. Springer-Verlag. ISBN 9783764377021; translated from Finnish into German by Manfred Stern.
- Tieteen aatelia: Lorenz Lindelöf ja Ernst Lindelöf. Otava, Helsinki 2008 (Finnish).
- Lars Ahlfors: At the Summit of Mathematics. American Mathematical Society. 2015. ISBN 978-1-4704-1846-5. 2015 pbk reprint
