= Felix Iversen =

Finnish mathematician and pacifist

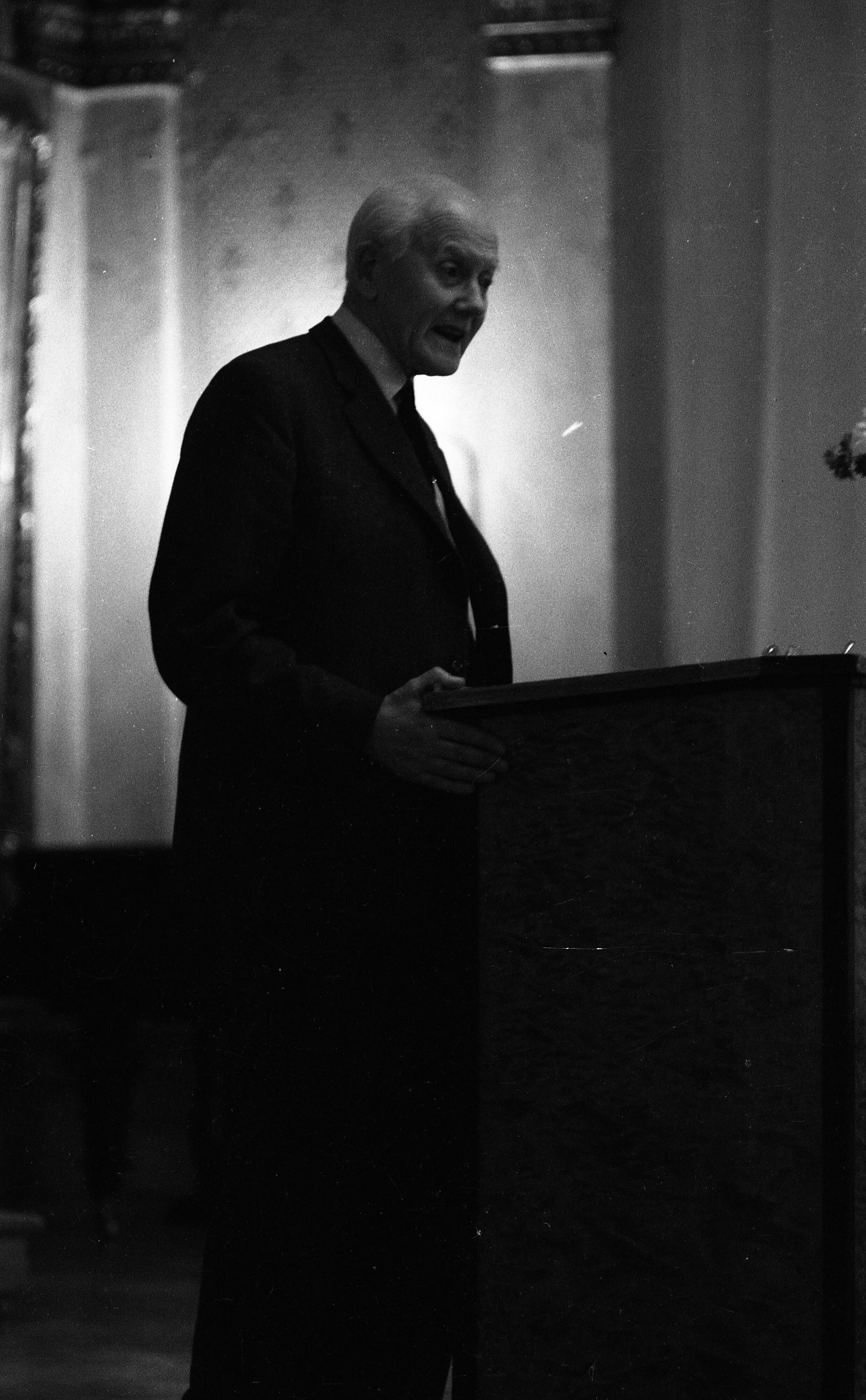
Iversen in 1951

Felix Christian Herbert Iversen (22 October 1887 – 31 July 1973) was a Finnish mathematician and a pacifist. He was a student of Ernst Lindelöf, and later an associate professor of mathematics at the University of Helsinki. Although he stopped performing serious research in mathematics around 1922, he continued working as a professor until his retirement in 1954 and published a textbook on mathematics in 1950. The Soviet Union awarded Felix Iversen the Stalin Peace Prize in 1954.
