= Group-based cryptography =

Application of group theory to cryptography

Group-based cryptography is a use of groups to construct cryptographic primitives. A group is a very general algebraic object and most cryptographic schemes use groups in some way. In particular Diffie–Hellman key exchange uses finite cyclic groups. So the term group-based cryptography refers mostly to cryptographic protocols that use infinite non-abelian groups such as a braid group.

== Examples ==
- Shpilrain–Zapata public-key protocols
- Magyarik–Wagner public key protocol
- Anshel–Anshel–Goldfeld key exchange
- Ko–Lee et al. key exchange protocol

== See also ==
- Non-commutative cryptography
