= Marion Scheepers =

(b.1957) South African-born mathematician at Boise State University

- Born: 21 December 1957 (age 68); Thabazimbi, South Africa
- Citizenship: American
- Education: University of Kansas
- Known for: selection principles, infinite topological and set-theoretic games
- Scientific career
- Fields: set theory game theory cryptology number theory
- Workplaces: Boise State University
- Thesis: The Meager-Nowhere Dense Game (1988)
- Doctoral advisor: Fred Galvin
- Website: Webpage at Boise State

Marion Scheepers is a South African-born mathematician, lecturer and researcher in the Department of Mathematics of Boise State University in Boise, Idaho since 1988. He is particularly known for his work on selection principles and on infinite topological and set-theoretical games. He introduced themes that are common to many selection principles and is responsible for the Scheepers diagram.

== Life ==
Scheepers was born in December 1957, in Thabazimbi, South Africa. He completed his Ph.D. thesis entitled The Meager-Nowhere Dense Game at the University of Kansas under the supervision of Fred Galvin. His research interests cover set theory and its relatives, game theory, cryptology, elementary number theory and algorithmic phenomena in biology. He was appointed Assistant Professor in the Department of Mathematics at Boise State University (BSU) in 1988 and promoted to Associate Professor in 1993. He has been Professor in the Department of Mathematics at BSU since 1996.

In 2016 he was part of a group at BSU that started an interdisciplinary course called Transdisciplinary Research Methods. In 2019 Scheepers was one of the coaches for BSU's elective Vertically Integrated Projects including Portable Secure Devices, a team aiming to develop methods to mitigate cyber-threats against active implantable medical devices.

Presently, Scheepers is studying biological encryption mechanisms in certain single-cell organisms in collaboration with researchers from the University of Witten-Herdecke in Germany, and the BSU Department of Biological Sciences. For this study, he has received grant funding from the National Science Foundation. The National Science Foundation has funded his research and curriculum activities on several occasions, including in 2005 for Crypto Systems in Ciliates

== Recognition, awards, membership ==
- 2012 Distinguished Professor in Mathematics, Boise State University.
- 2014 BSU recognised Scheepers' 26 years of academic service.
- 2017 The conference Frontiers of Selection Principles at Cardinal Stefan Wyszyński University in Warsaw, Poland was dedicated to Scheepers.

== Selected publications ==
- "Set theory and its applications : annual Boise Extravaganza in Set Theory". Boise State University Albertsons Library. 14 August 2019.
- Babinkostova, L.; Pansera, B.A.; Scheepers, M. (2019). "Selective versions of θ-density". Topology and Its Applications. 258. Elsevier BV: 268–281. doi:10.1016/j.topol.2019.02.061. ISSN 0166-8641. S2CID 126972852.
- Galvin, Fred; Scheepers, Marion (19 December 2015). "Baire spaces and infinite games". Archive for Mathematical Logic. 55 (1–2). Springer Science and Business Media LLC: 85–104. arXiv:1401.6061. doi:10.1007/s00153-015-0461-8. ISSN 0933-5846. S2CID 206887747.
- Scheepers, Marion (2011). "Rothberger bounded groups and Ramsey theory". Topology and Its Applications. 158 (13). Elsevier BV: 1575–1583. arXiv:1011.1869. doi:10.1016/j.topol.2011.05.025. ISSN 0166-8641. S2CID 119155731.
- Samet, Nadav; Scheepers, Marion; Tsaban, Boaz (2009). "Partition relations for Hurewicz-type selection hypotheses". Topology and Its Applications. 156 (3): 616–623. arXiv:0811.1016. doi:10.1016/j.topol.2008.08.013. ISSN 0166-8641. S2CID 16410566.
