= Pekka Myrberg =

Finnish mathematician (1892–1976)

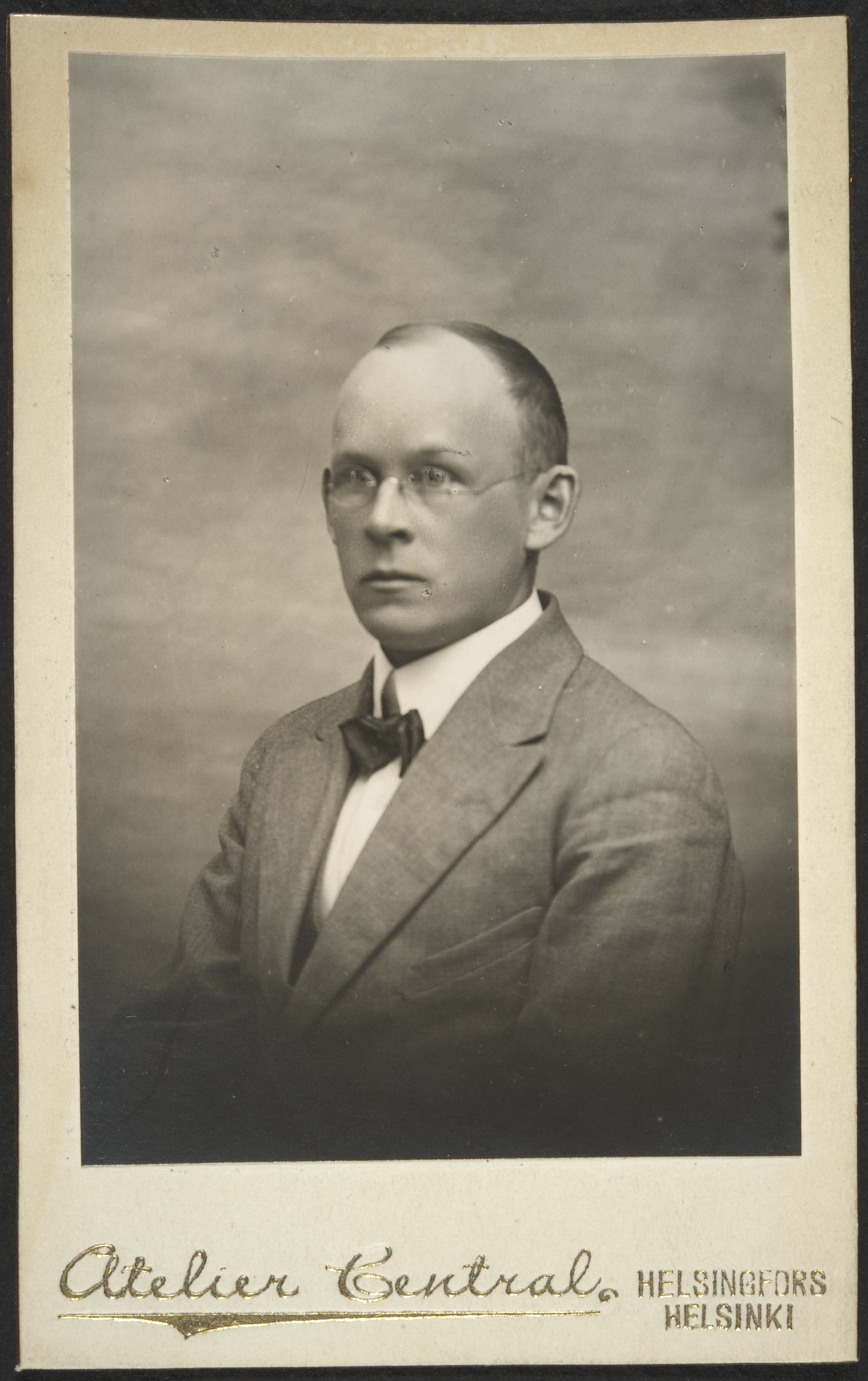
Myrberg photographed in 1922

Pekka Juhana Myrberg (30 December 1892, Viipuri – 8 November 1976, Helsinki) was a Finnish mathematician known for developing the concept of period-doubling bifurcation in a paper published in the 1950s. The concept was further developed by Mitchell Feigenbaum during the 1970s.

Myrberg received his PhD in 1916 at the University of Helsinki under Ernst Lindelöf with thesis Zur Theorie der Konvergenz der Poincaré´schen Reihen ('On the theory of the convergence of Poincaré's series'). He began his career by teaching at a gymnasium, and then became professor extraordinarius at the University of Helsinki in 1921 and professor ordinarius in 1926. In 1952 he became the rector and then served as the chancellor of the University of Helsinki from 1952 to 1962. In 1962 he retired as professor emeritus but continued publishing mathematical papers into the 1970s.

In the 1950s, Myberg published several fundamental papers on the iteration of rational functions (especially quadratic functions). His research revived interest in the results of Gaston Julia and Pierre Fatou published during the beginning of the 20th century.

Myberg was a member of the Finnish Academy of Sciences. In 1954 he was an invited speaker (Über die Integration der Poissonschen Gleichung auf Riemannschen Flächen) at the International Mathematical Congress in Amsterdam.
