= Lindelöf's lemma =

In mathematics, Lindelöf's lemma is a simple but useful lemma in topology on the real line, named for the Finnish mathematician Ernst Leonard Lindelöf.

== Statement of the lemma ==
Let the real line have its standard topology. Then every open subset of the real line is a countable union of open intervals.

== Generalized Statement ==
Lindelöf's lemma is also known as the statement that every open cover in a second-countable space has a countable subcover (Kelley 1955:49). This means that every second-countable space is also a Lindelöf space.

== Proof of the generalized statement ==
Let $B$ be a countable basis of $X$. Consider an open cover, $\mathcal{F} = \bigcup_{\alpha} U_{\alpha}$. To get prepared for the following deduction, we define two sets for convenience, $B_{\alpha} := \left \{ \beta \in B: \beta \subset U_{\alpha} \right \}$, $B':= \bigcup_{\alpha} B_{\alpha}$.

A straight-forward but essential observation is that, $U_{\alpha} = \bigcup_{\beta \in B_{\alpha}} \beta$ which is from the definition of base. Therefore, we can get that,

$\mathcal{F} = \bigcup_{\alpha} U_{\alpha} = \bigcup_{\alpha} \bigcup_{\beta \in B_{\alpha}} \beta = \bigcup_{\beta \in B'} \beta$

where $B' \subset B$, and is therefore at most countable. Next, by construction, for each $\beta\in B'$ there is some $\delta_{\beta}$ such that $\beta\subset U_{\delta_{\beta}}$. We can therefore write

$\mathcal{F} = \bigcup_{\beta\in B'} U_{\delta_{\beta}}$

completing the proof.
