= Hadamard three-lines theorem =

Theorem in complex analysis

In complex analysis, a branch of mathematics, the Hadamard three-line theorem is a result about the behaviour of holomorphic functions defined in regions bounded by parallel lines in the complex plane. The theorem is named after the French mathematician Jacques Hadamard.

== Statement ==
Hadamard three-line theorem—Let $f(z)$ be a bounded function of $z = x + i y$ defined on the strip

$$\{ x + iy : a \leq x \leq b \},$$

holomorphic in the interior of the strip and continuous on the whole strip. If

$$M(x) = \sup_y |f(x+iy)|$$

then $\log M(x)$ is a convex function on $[a, b].$

In other words, if $x = t a + (1-t) b$ with $0 \leq t \leq 1,$ then

$$M(x) \leq M(a)^t M(b)^{1-t}.$$

Proof

Define $F(z)$ by

$$F(z)=f(z) M(a)^{{z-b\over b-a}}M(b)^{{z-a\over a-b}}$$

where $|F(z)| \leq 1$ on the edges of the strip. The result follows once it is shown that the inequality also holds in the interior of the strip. After an affine transformation in the coordinate $z,$ it can be assumed that $a = 0$ and $b = 1.$ The function

$$F_n(z) = F(z) e^{z^2/n}e^{-1/n}$$

tends to $0$ as $|z|$ tends to infinity and satisfies $|F_n| \leq 1$ on the boundary of the strip. The maximum modulus principle can therefore be applied to $F_n$ in the strip. So $|F_n(z)| \leq 1.$ Because $F_n(z)$ tends to $F(z)$ as $n$ tends to infinity, it follows that $|F(z)| \leq 1.$ ∎

== Applications ==
The three-line theorem can be used to prove the Hadamard three-circle theorem for a bounded continuous function $g(z)$ on an annulus $\{ z: r \leq |z| \leq R \},$ holomorphic in the interior. Indeed applying the theorem to

$$f(z) = g(e^{z}),$$

shows that, if

$$m(s) = \sup_{|z| = e^s} |g(z)|,$$

then $\log\, m(s)$ is a convex function of $s.$

The three-line theorem also holds for functions with values in a Banach space and plays an important role in complex interpolation theory. It can be used to prove Hölder's inequality for measurable functions

$$\int |gh| \leq \left(\int |g|^p\right)^{1\over p} \cdot \left(\int |h|^q\right)^{1\over q},$$

where ${1\over p} + {1\over q} = 1,$ by considering the function

$$f(z) = \int |g|^{pz} |h|^{q(1-z)}.$$

== See also ==
- Riesz–Thorin theorem
- Phragmén–Lindelöf principle
