= Pseudo-intersection =

In mathematical set theory, a pseudo-intersection of a family of sets is an infinite set S such that each element of the family contains all but a finite number of elements of S. The pseudo-intersection number, sometimes denoted by the fraktur letter 𝔭, is the smallest size of a family of infinite subsets of the natural numbers that has the strong finite intersection property but has no pseudo-intersection.
