= Boaz Tsaban =

Israeli mathematician

Professor Boaz Tsaban
- בועז צבאן
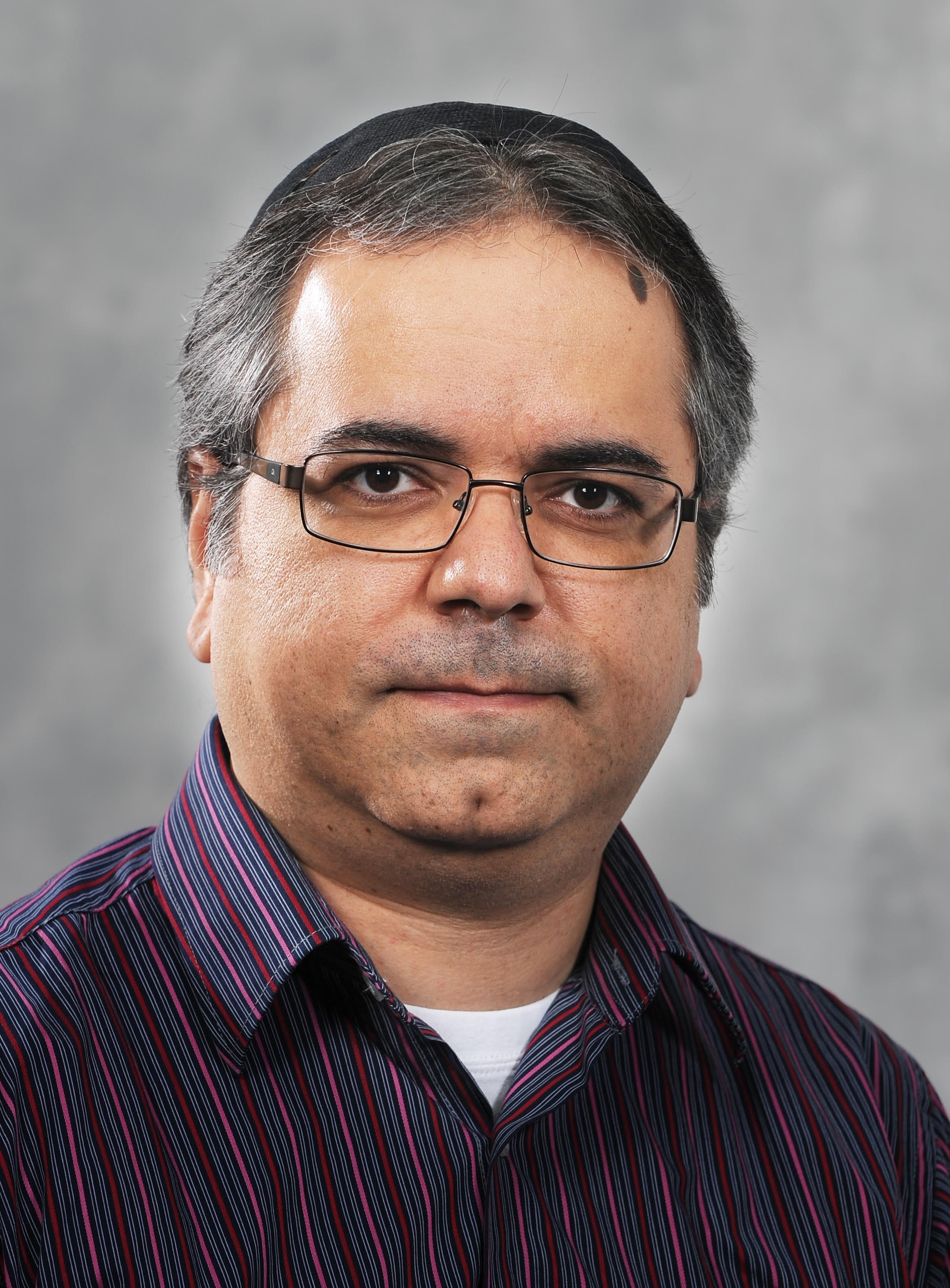
- Born: 6 February 1973 (age 53); Or Yehuda
- Awards: Nessyahu prize, Wolf Foundation Krill Prize
- Scientific career
- Fields: Mathematics
- Institutions: Bar Ilan University
- Doctoral advisor: Hillel Furstenberg

Boaz Tsaban (Hebrew: בועז צבאן; born February 1973) is an Israeli mathematician on the faculty of Bar-Ilan University. His research interests include selection principles within set theory and nonabelian cryptology, within mathematical cryptology.

== Biography ==
Boaz Tsaban grew up in Or Yehuda, a city near Tel Aviv. At the age of 16 he was selected with other high school students to attend the first cycle of a special preparation program in mathematics, at Bar-Ilan University, being admitted to regular mathematics courses at the University a year later. He completed his B.Sc., M.Sc. and Ph.D. degrees with highest distinctions. Two years as a post-doctoral fellow at Hebrew University were followed by a three-year Koshland Fellowship at the Weizmann Institute of Science before he joined the Department of Mathematics, Bar-Ilan University in 2007.

== Academic career ==
In the field of selection principles, Tsaban devised the method of omission of intervals for establishing covering properties of sets of real numbers that have certain combinatorial structures. In nonabelian cryptology he devised the algebraic span method that solved a number of computational problems that underlie a number of proposals for nonabelian public-key cryptographic schemes (such as the commutator key exchange).

== Awards and recognition ==
Tsaban's doctoral dissertation, supervised by Hillel Furstenberg, won, with Irit Dinur, the Nessyahu prize for the best Ph.D. in mathematics in Israel in 2003. In 2009 he won the Wolf Foundation Krill Prize for Excellence in Scientific Research.
