= Maximum modulus principle =

Mathematical theorem in complex analysis

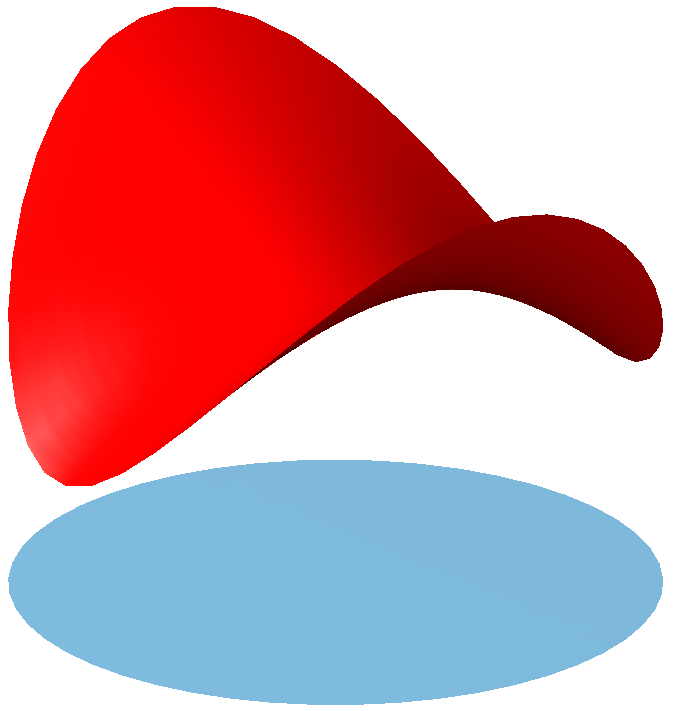
A plot of the modulus of $\cos(z)$ (in red) for $z$ in the unit disk centered at the origin (shown in blue). As predicted by the theorem, the maximum of the modulus cannot be inside of the disk (so the highest value on the red surface is somewhere along its edge).

In mathematics, the maximum modulus principle in complex analysis states that if $f$ is a holomorphic function, then the modulus $|f|$ cannot exhibit a strict maximum that is strictly within the domain of $f$.

In other words, either $f$ is locally a constant function, or, for any point $z_0$ inside the domain of $f$ there exist other points arbitrarily close to $z_0$ at which $|f|$ takes larger values.

== Formal statement ==
Let $f$ be a holomorphic function on some bounded and connected open subset $D$ of the complex plane $\mathbb{C}$ and taking complex values. If $z_0$ is a point in $D$ such that

$$|f(z_0)|\ge |f(z)|$$

for all $z$ in some neighborhood of $z_0$, then $f$ is constant on $D$.

This statement can be viewed as a special case of the open mapping theorem, which states that a nonconstant holomorphic function maps open sets to open sets: If $|f|$ attains a local maximum at $z$, then the image of a sufficiently small open neighborhood of $z$ cannot be open, so $f$ is constant.

=== Related statement ===
Suppose that $D$ is a bounded nonempty connected open subset of $\mathbb{C}$. Let $\overline{D}$ be the closure of $D$. Suppose that $f \colon \overline{D} \to \mathbb{C}$ is a continuous function that is holomorphic on $D$. Then $|f(z)|$ attains a maximum at some point of the boundary of $D$.

This follows from the first version as follows. Since $\overline{D}$ is compact and nonempty, the continuous function $|f(z)|$ attains a maximum at some point $z_0$ of $\overline{D}$. If $z_0$ is not on the boundary, then the maximum modulus principle implies that $f$ is constant, so $|f(z)|$ also attains the same maximum at any point of the boundary.

=== Minimum modulus principle ===
For a holomorphic function $f$ on a connected open set $D$ of $\mathbb{C}$, if $z_0$ is a point in $D$ such that

$$0 < |f(z_0)| \le |f(z)|$$

for all $z$ in some neighborhood of $z_0$, then $f$ is constant on $D$.

Proof: Apply the maximum modulus principle to $1/f$.

== Sketches of proofs ==
=== Using the maximum principle for harmonic functions ===
One can use the equality

$$\log f(z) = \ln |f(z)| + i\arg f(z)$$

for complex natural logarithms to deduce that $\ln |f (z) |$ is a harmonic function. Since $z_0$ is a local maximum for this function also, it follows from the maximum principle that $| f (z) |$ is constant. Then, using the Cauchy–Riemann equations we show that $f'(z)$ = 0, and thus that $f(z)$ is constant as well. Similar reasoning shows that $| f (z) |$ can only have a local minimum (which necessarily has value 0) at an isolated zero of $f(z)$.

=== Using Gauss's mean value theorem ===
Another proof works by using Gauss's mean value theorem to "force" all points within overlapping open disks to assume the same value as the maximum. The disks are laid such that their centers form a polygonal path from the value where $f(z)$ is maximized to any other point in the domain, while being totally contained within the domain. Thus the existence of a maximum value implies that all the values in the domain are the same, thus $f(z)$ is constant.

=== Using Cauchy's Integral Formula ===
As $D$ is open, there exists $\overline{B}(z_{0},r)$ (a closed ball centered at $z_{0} \in D$ with radius $r>0$) such that $\overline{B}(z_{0},r) \subset D$. We then define the boundary of the closed ball with positive orientation as $\gamma(t)=z_{0}+re^{it}, t \in [0,2\pi]$. Invoking Cauchy's integral formula, we obtain

$$0 \leq \int_{0}^{2\pi} |f(z_{0})|-| f(z_{0}+re^{it})| \,dt \leq 0$$

For all $t \in [0,2\pi]$, $| f(z_{0}) |-| f(z_{0}+re^{it}) | \geq 0$, so $| f(z_{0})|=| f(z_{0}+re^{it}) |$. This also holds for all balls of radius less than $r$ centered at $a$. Therefore, $f(z)=f(z_{0})$ for all $z \in \overline{B}(z_{0},r)$.

Now consider the constant function $g(z)=f(z_{0})$ for all $z \in D$. Then one can construct a sequence of distinct points located in $\overline{B}(z_{0},r)$ where the holomorphic function $g-f$ vanishes. As $\overline{B}(z_{0},r)$ is closed, the sequence converges to some point in $\overline{B}(z_{0},r) \in D$. This means $f-g$ vanishes everywhere in $D$ which implies $f(z)=f(z_{0})$ for all $z \in D$.

== Physical interpretation ==
A physical interpretation of this principle comes from the heat equation. That is, since $\log | f(z) |$ is harmonic, it is thus the steady state of a heat flow on the region $D$. Suppose a strict maximum was attained on the interior of $D$, the heat at this maximum would be dispersing to the points around it, which would contradict the assumption that this represents the steady state of a system.

== Applications ==
The maximum modulus principle has many uses in complex analysis, and may be used to prove the following:

- The fundamental theorem of algebra.
- Schwarz's lemma, a result which in turn has many generalisations and applications in complex analysis.
- The Phragmén–Lindelöf principle, an extension to unbounded domains.
- The Borel–Carathéodory theorem, which bounds an analytic function in terms of its real part.
- The Hadamard three-lines theorem, a result about the behaviour of bounded holomorphic functions on a line between two other parallel lines in the complex plane.
