= Lorenz Leonard Lindelöf =

Finnish mathematician and astronomer

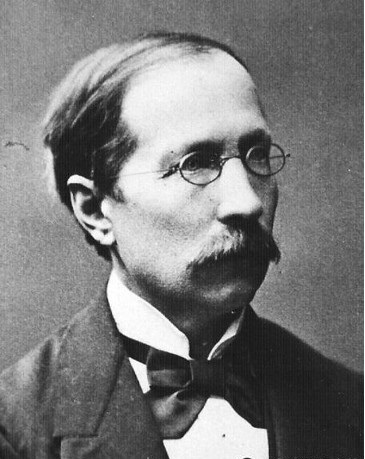
- Born: 13 November 1827; Karvia
- Died: 3 March 1908 (aged 80); Helsingfors
- Resting place: Hietaniemi Cemetery
- Education: University of Helsinki
- Spouse: Gabriella Krogius Lindelöf (m. 1867; died 1896)
- Children: 9, including Ernst
- Awards: Steiner Prize of the Prussian Academy of Sciences (1880)
- Scientific career
- Fields: Astronomy, mathematics
- Workplaces: University of Helsinki

Lorenz Leonard Lindelöf (13 November 1827, Karvia, Finland – 3 March 1908, Helsinki) was a Finnish mathematician, astronomer and politician.

== Biography ==
Lindelöf grew up in a poor family. He learned German and French and studied astronomy and mathematics at the University of Helsinki. He initially specialized in astronomy at the graduate level and was at Pulkovo Observatory in 1855–1856. After his completion of his PhD (Promotierung), Lindelöf from 1857 to 1874 held the professorial chair of mathematics in Helsinki and from 1869 to 1872 was the rector of the university. He then resigned his professorial chair in favor of Mittag-Leffler and turned to politics. Lindelöf was from 1874 to 1902 minister of state education in Finland and also did actuarial work for Kaleva Mutual Insurance Company. In 1883 he was knighted and in 1888 was a member of the State Council. He was in the Finnish Parliament, served on many committees and was in 1900 District Marshal.

Lindelöf published papers on minimal surfaces, the calculus of variations, differential geometry, mechanics, celestial mechanics and pension funds.

His son Ernst Leonard Lindelöf became a famous mathematician.

In 1859 Lorenz Lindelöf became a member of the Finnish Society of Sciences and Letters and in 1867 its permanent secretary. He also became in 1900 a member of the Royal Society of Sciences in Uppsala. In 1880 he received the Steiner Prize of the Prussian Academy of Sciences.

His burial took place in Hietaniemi cemetery.

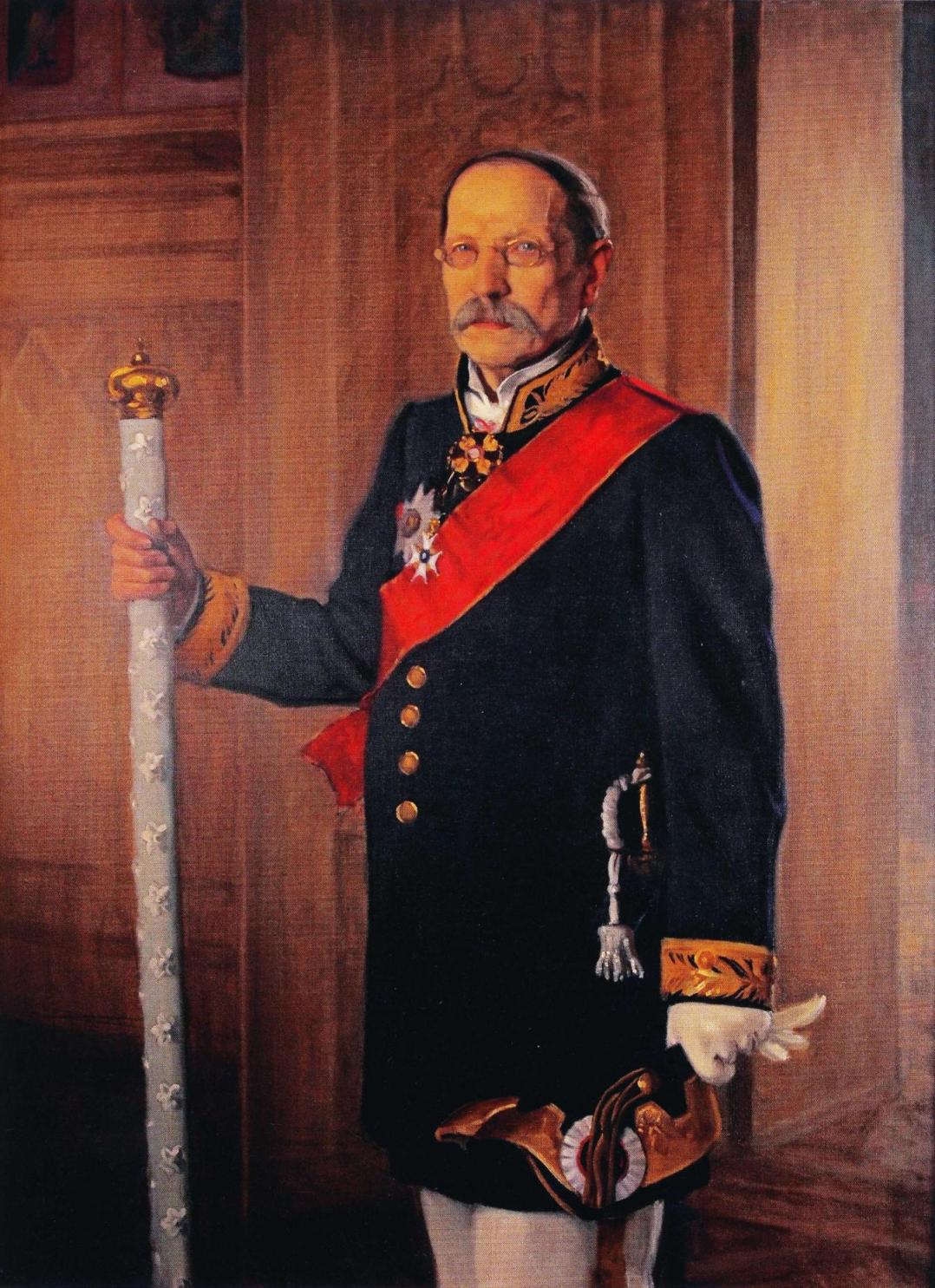

== Selected works ==
- Limites entre lesquelles le caténoïde est une surface minima, Acta Soc. Scient. Fenn., No. 9, 1871.
- Lärobok i analytisk Geometri, Helsinki, 1877 (Handbook of Analytic Geometry in Swedish)
- Trajectoire d'un corps assujetti à se mouvoir sur la surface de la terre sous l'influence de la rotation terrestre, Acta Soc. Scient. Fenn., No. 16, 1888
- Variationskalkylens teori och dess användning till bestämmande af multipla integralers maxima och minima, 1855
- Nouvelle demonstration d´un théorème fondamental du calcul de variations, Compte Rendus Acad. Sci. Paris, 1861
- Détermination analytique de la forme des ondes lumineuses élémentaires, Acta Soc. Scient. Fenn., No. 6, 1861
- Recherches sur les polyèdres maxima, Acta Soc. Scient. Fenn., No. 24, 1898.
- with the Abbé Moigno: Leçons de calcul des variations, Paris: Mallet-Bachelier, 1861

== Sources ==
- Olli Lehto Tieteen aatelia: Lorenz Lindelöf ja Ernst Lindelöf, Otava, Helsinki 2008 (Finnish).
