= Ernst Leonard Lindelöf =

Finnish mathematician (1870–1946)

Ernst Lindelöf
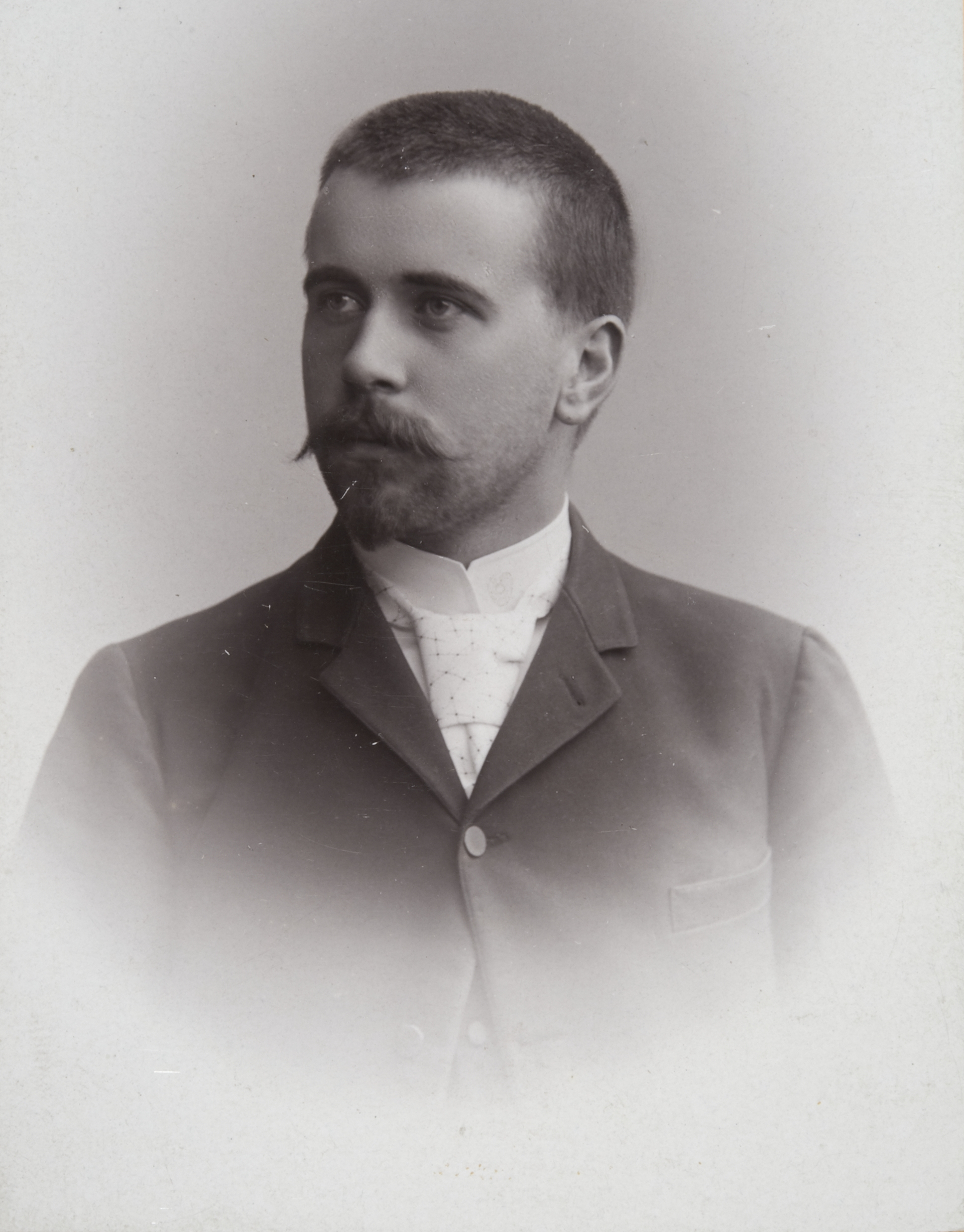
- Born: 7 March 1870; Helsinki
- Died: 4 June 1946 (aged 76); Helsinki
- Citizenship: Finnish
- Education: University of Helsinki (PhD, 1893)
- Known for: Lindelöf hypothesis Lindelöf's lemma Lindelöf's theorem Lindelöf space Phragmén–Lindelöf principle Picard–Lindelöf theorem Founder of the Finnish school of function theory
- Scientific career
- Fields: Mathematics
- Workplaces: University of Helsinki
- Thesis: Sur les systèmes complets et le calcul des invariants différentiels des groupes continus finis (1893)
- Doctoral advisor: Hjalmar Mellin
- Doctoral students: Lars Ahlfors; Rolf Nevanlinna; Pekka Myrberg; Felix Iversen

Ernst Leonard Lindelöf (Swedish pronunciation: [ˈlɪ̂nːdɛˌløːv]; 7 March 1870 – 4 June 1946) was a Finnish mathematician, who made contributions in real analysis, complex analysis and topology. Lindelöf spaces are named after him. He was the son of mathematician Lorenz Leonard Lindelöf, whose chair he would eventually succeed through his cousin Edvard Rudolf Neovius, and brother of the philologist Uno Lorenz Lindelöf. He founded the Finnish school of function theory, which achieved lasting international renown.

He was secretary of the Finnish Society of Science and Letters (societas scientiarum Fennica) in its centenary year, 1938.

== Biography ==
=== Early life and education ===
Lindelöf was born in Helsingfors into a mathematical family: his father Lorenz Leonard Lindelöf was professor of mathematics at the University of Helsinki, and just over a decade later that same chair passed to his cousin Edvard Rudolf Neovius. When Lindelöf succeeded his cousin at the age of 33, he completed a remarkable mathematical dynasty spanning three generations of the same family. His brother Uno Lindelöf became a professor of English philology.

Lindelöf showed an early talent for mathematics and decided as a schoolboy to follow his father's path. Lindelöf studied at the University of Helsinki, where he completed his PhD in 1893, became a docent in 1895 and professor of Mathematics in 1903. He retired in 1938.

=== Research ===
Lindelöf visited Paris for the first time in 1893, staying for a year, and returned for the academic year 1898–1899. The second visit decisively shaped his career: he chose as his research subject the regular analytic functions in the complex plane, the so-called entire functions, and became the first non-French mathematician to make significant contributions to the theory of these functions.

The leading researcher in the field was Émile Borel, who wrote to Lindelöf inviting him to become the first foreign author in his subsequently world-famous monograph series: "I thought of you immediately, and it would please me greatly if you could become the series' first foreign author." Borel hoped that "Cauchy's delightful invention, the calculus of residues, might be revived" and proposed this as Lindelöf's topic. The choice was apt: Lindelöf had thoroughly studied the entire output of Augustin-Louis Cauchy, comprising over 700 publications. His resulting book Le calcul des résidus et ses applications à la théorie des fonctions (Paris, 1905) has remained a landmark in function theory.

In addition to working in a number of different mathematical domains including complex analysis, conformal mappings, topology, ordinary differential equations and the gamma function, Lindelöf promoted the study of the history of Finnish mathematics.

After the turn of the century, Lindelöf made two extended visits to Göttingen. His period of active research lasted roughly until 1915. He is known for the Picard–Lindelöf theorem on differential equations and the Phragmén–Lindelöf principle, one of several refinements of the maximum modulus principle that he proved in complex function theory, the latter developed in collaboration with Lars Edvard Phragmén. His results on boundary properties of conformal mappings were also significant.

Of particular interest is a 1904 paper on the topology of point sets in n-dimensional Euclidean space. At the time it attracted little attention, but today Lindelöf's name is perhaps best known in mathematics for the Lindelöf spaces he defined in that paper. Around 1915 Lindelöf's period of active research drew to a close, and he increasingly devoted his energy to teaching and to guiding the next generation of Finnish mathematicians.

The professorship in mathematics at Helsinki had become vacant after Neovius moved to political and administrative duties. Lindelöf's two competitors, Hjalmar Mellin and Torsten Brodén from Lund, both withdrew their applications. Lindelöf was appointed professor in 1903 and held the position until his retirement in 1938.

=== Teaching ===
From the beginning of his academic career, Lindelöf devoted much time to teaching. His lectures were said to be rich in content and crystal-clear in form. Rolf Nevanlinna recalled that he always went to Lindelöf's lectures in a festive mood. Lindelöf took a personal interest in his students as individuals, devoting time without stint to guiding those he considered promising researchers. He had the ability to be critical and encouraging at the same time, and combined mathematical mastery with a harder-to-define charisma that inspired admiration and respect. He had an unflinching sense of duty while showing no desire to emphasise his own position.

Among his doctoral students in the 1910s were Felix Iversen, Pekka Myrberg, Kalle Väisälä, Vilho Väisälä, Nils Pipping, Frithiof Nevanlinna, and Rolf Nevanlinna, followed by E. J. Nyström and Ensio Kivikoski in the early 1920s. These students held the chairs of mathematics at Finnish universities well into the late 1940s.

Lindelöf also wrote seven textbooks that formed the foundation of university mathematics instruction in Finland. The first appeared in 1912 and the last a few months after his death in 1946; they were not replaced until the 1960s.

=== Legacy of the Finnish school ===
He founded the Finnish school of function theory, which achieved lasting international renown. Its most significant achievement was the theory of meromorphic functions, created by Rolf Nevanlinna in 1922–1925. The young Lars Ahlfors rose at the end of the decade to become one of the world's leading researchers in the field. At the 1936 International Congress of Mathematicians, Ahlfors was awarded the first Fields Medal, and in his presentation speech Constantin Carathéodory highlighted the Finnish school founded by Ernst Lindelöf.

=== Other activities ===
Lindelöf was chairman of the Finnish Mathematical Society for over four decades. He was a member of the Finnish Society of Sciences and Letters from 1904, and served as its permanent secretary from 1934 to 1945.

Music was a lifelong interest. As a violinist he far exceeded ordinary amateur level. As a student he played in a quartet that also included Jean Sibelius. He later served on the board of the Helsinki Philharmonic Orchestra.

=== Honours ===
He was a member of the Royal Society of Sciences in Uppsala from 1913 and of the Royal Swedish Academy of Sciences from 1917. He received honorary doctorates from the universities of Oslo (1929), Uppsala (1932), and Stockholm (1936).

== Selected bibliography ==
- Le calcul des résidus et ses applications à la théorie des fonctions (Paris, 1905)
- Mémoire sur la théorie des fonctions entières d'ordre fini ("Acta societatis scientiarum fennicae" 31, 1903)
- With Lars Edvard Phragmén: "Sur une extension d'un principe classique de l'analyse et sur quelques propriétés des fonctions monogènes dans le voisinage d'un point singulier", in: Acta Mathematica 31, 1908.
