= Non-commutative cryptography =

Non-commutative cryptography is the area of cryptology where the cryptographic primitives, methods and systems are based on algebraic structures like semigroups, groups and rings which are non-commutative. One of the earliest applications of a non-commutative algebraic structure for cryptographic purposes was the use of braid groups to develop cryptographic protocols. Later several other non-commutative structures like Thompson groups, polycyclic groups, Grigorchuk groups, and matrix groups have been identified as potential candidates for cryptographic applications. In contrast to non-commutative cryptography, the currently widely used public-key cryptosystems like RSA cryptosystem, Diffie–Hellman key exchange and elliptic curve cryptography are based on number theory and hence depend on commutative algebraic structures.

Non-commutative cryptographic protocols have been developed for solving various cryptographic problems like key exchange, encryption-decryption, and authentication. These protocols are very similar to the corresponding protocols in the commutative case.

== Some non-commutative cryptographic protocols ==
In these protocols it would be assumed that G is a non-abelian group. If w and a are elements of G the notation w^{a} would indicate the element a^{−1}wa.

=== Protocols for key exchange ===
==== Protocol due to Ko, Lee, et al. ====
The following protocol due to Ko, Lee, et al., establishes a common secret key K for Alice and Bob.

1. An element w of G is published.
2. Two subgroups A and B of G such that ab = ba for all a in A and b in B are published.
3. Alice chooses an element a from A and sends w^{a} to Bob. Alice keeps a private.
4. Bob chooses an element b from B and sends w^{b} to Alice. Bob keeps b private.
5. Alice computes K = (w^{b})^{a} = w^{ba}.
6. Bob computes K' = (w^{a})^{b}=w^{ab}.
7. Since ab = ba, K = K'. Alice and Bob share the common secret key K.

==== Anshel-Anshel-Goldfeld protocol ====
This a key exchange protocol using a non-abelian group G. It is significant because it does not require two commuting subgroups A and B of G as in the case of the protocol due to Ko, Lee, et al.

1. Elements a_{1}, a_{2}, . . . , a_{k}, b_{1}, b_{2}, . . . , b_{m} from G are selected and published.
2. Alice picks a private x in G as a word in a_{1}, a_{2}, . . . , a_{k}; that is, x = x( a_{1}, a_{2}, . . . , a_{k} ).
3. Alice sends b_{1}^{x}, b_{2}^{x}, . . . , b_{m}^{x} to Bob.
4. Bob picks a private y in G as a word in b_{1}, b_{2}, . . . , b_{m}; that is y = y ( b_{1}, b_{2}, . . . , b_{m} ).
5. Bob sends a_{1}^{y}, a_{2}^{y}, . . . , a_{k}^{y} to Alice.
6. Alice and Bob share the common secret key K = x^{−1}y^{−1}xy.
7. Alice computes x ( a_{1}^{y}, a_{2}^{y}, . . . , a_{k}^{y} ) = y^{−1} xy. Pre-multiplying it with x^{−1}, Alice gets K.
8. Bob computes y ( b_{1}^{x}, b_{2}^{x}, . . . , b_{m}^{x}) = x^{−1}yx. Pre-multiplying it with y^{−1} and then taking the inverse, Bob gets K.

==== Stickel's key exchange protocol ====
In the original formulation of this protocol the group used was the group of invertible matrices over a finite field.

1. Let G be a public non-abelian finite group.
2. Let a, b be public elements of G such that ab ≠ ba. Let the orders of a and b be N and M respectively.
3. Alice chooses two random numbers n < N and m < M and sends u = a^{m}b^{n} to Bob.
4. Bob picks two random numbers r < N and s < M and sends v = a^{r}b^{s} to Alice.
5. The common key shared by Alice and Bob is K = a^{m + r}b^{n + s}.
6. Alice computes the key by K = a^{m}vb^{n}.
7. Bob computes the key by K = a^{r}ub^{s}.

=== Protocols for encryption and decryption ===
This protocol describes how to encrypt a secret message and then decrypt using a non-commutative group. Let Alice want to send a secret message m to Bob.

1. Let G be a non-commutative group. Let A and B be public subgroups of G such that ab = ba for all a in A and b in B.
2. An element x from G is chosen and published.
3. Bob chooses a secret key b from A and publishes z = x^{b} as his public key.
4. Alice chooses a random r from B and computes t = z^{r}.
5. The encrypted message is C = (x^{r}, H(t) $\oplus$ m), where H is some hash function and $\oplus$ denotes the XOR operation. Alice sends C to Bob.
6. To decrypt C, Bob recovers t as follows: (x^{r})^{b} = x^{rb} = x^{br} = (x^{b})^{r} = z^{r} = t. The plain text message send by Alice is P = ( H(t) $\oplus$ m ) $\oplus$ H(t) = m.

=== Protocols for authentication ===
Let Bob want to check whether the sender of a message is really Alice.

1. Let G be a non-commutative group and let A and B be subgroups of G such that ab = ba for all a in A and b in B.
2. An element w from G is selected and published.
3. Alice chooses a private s from A and publishes the pair ( w, t ) where t = w ^{s}.
4. Bob chooses an r from B and sends a challenge w′ = w^{r} to Alice.
5. Alice sends the response w′′ = (w′)^{s} to Bob.
6. Bob checks if w′′ = t^{r}. If this true, then the identity of Alice is established.

== Security basis of the protocols ==
The basis for the security and strength of the various protocols presented above is the difficulty of the following two problems:

- The conjugacy decision problem (also called the conjugacy problem): Given two elements u and v in a group G determine whether there exists an element x in G such that v = u^{x}, that is, such that v = x^{−1} ux.
- The conjugacy search problem: Given two elements u and v in a group G find an element x in G such that v = u^{x}, that is, such that v = x^{−1} ux.

If no algorithm is known to solve the conjugacy search problem, then the function x → u^{x} can be considered as a one-way function.

== Platform groups ==
A non-commutative group that is used in a particular cryptographic protocol is called the platform group of that protocol. Only groups having certain properties can be used as the platform groups for the implementation of non-commutative cryptographic protocols. Let G be a group suggested as a platform group for a certain non-commutative cryptographic system. The following is a list of the properties expected of G.

1. The group G must be well-known and well-studied.
2. The word problem in G should have a fast solution by a deterministic algorithm. There should be an efficiently computable "normal form" for elements of G.
3. It should be impossible to recover the factors x and y from the product xy in G.
4. The number of elements of length n in G should grow faster than any polynomial in n. (Here "length n" is the length of a word representing a group element.)

== Examples of platform groups ==
=== Braid groups ===
Let n be a positive integer. The braid group B_{n} is a group generated by x_{1}, x_{2}, . . . , x_{n−1} having the following presentation:

$$B_n = \left\langle x_1, x_2, \ldots, x_{n-1} \big| x_ix_j=x_jx_i \text{ if } |i-j| >1 \text{ and } x_ix_jx_i=x_jx_ix_j \text{ if } |i-j|=1 \right\rangle$$

=== Thompson's group ===
Thompson's group is an infinite group F having the following infinite presentation:

$$F = \left\langle x_0, x_1, x_2, \ldots \big| x_k^{-1}x_nx_k=x_{n+1} \text{ for } k<n \right\rangle$$

=== Grigorchuk's group ===
Let T denote the infinite rooted binary tree. The set V of vertices is the set of all finite binary sequences. Let A(T) denote the set of all automorphisms of T. (An automorphism of T permutes vertices preserving connectedness.) The Grigorchuk's group Γ is the subgroup of A(T) generated by the automorphisms a, b, c, d defined as follows:

- $a(b_1,b_2,\ldots, b_n) = (1-b_1,b_2,\ldots, b_n)$
- $$b(b_1,b_2,\ldots,b_n) = \begin{cases} (b_1, 1-b_2, \ldots, b_n) & \text{ if } b_1=0\\ (b_1, c(b_2,\ldots, b_n))&\text{ if } b_1=1 \end{cases}$$
- $$c(b_1,b_2,\ldots,b_n) = \begin{cases} (b_1, 1-b_2, \ldots, b_n) & \text{ if } b_1=0\\ (b_1, d(b_2,\ldots, b_n))&\text{ if } b_1=1 \end{cases}$$
- $$d(b_1,b_2,\ldots,b_n) = \begin{cases} (b_1, b_2, \ldots, b_n) & \text{ if } b_1=0\\ (b_1, b(b_2,\ldots, b_n))&\text{ if } b_1=1 \end{cases}$$

=== Artin group ===
An Artin group A(Γ) is a group with the following presentation:

$$A(\Gamma) = \left\langle a_1, a_2, \ldots, a_n | \mu_{ij} = \mu_{ji} \text{ for } 1 \le i < j \le n \right\rangle$$

where $\mu_{ij} = a_ia_ja_i\ldots$ ($m_{ij}$ factors) and $m_{ij} = m_{ji}$.

=== Matrix groups ===
Let F be a finite field. Groups of matrices over F have been used as the platform groups of certain non-commutative cryptographic protocols.

== See also ==
- Group-based cryptography
