= Strong measure zero set =

In mathematical analysis, a strong measure zero set is a subset A of the real line with the following property:

for every sequence (ε_{n}) of positive reals there exists a sequence (I_{n}) of intervals such that |I_{n}| < ε_{n} for all n and A is contained in the union of the I_{n}.

(Here |I_{n}| denotes the length of the interval I_{n}.)

Every countable set is a strong measure zero set, and so is every union of countably many strong measure zero sets. Every strong measure zero set has Lebesgue measure 0. The Cantor set is an example of an uncountable set of Lebesgue measure 0 which is not of strong measure zero.

Borel's conjecture states that every strong measure zero set is countable. It is now known that this statement is independent of ZFC (the Zermelo–Fraenkel axioms of set theory, which is the standard axiom system assumed in mathematics). This means that Borel's conjecture can neither be proven nor disproven in ZFC (assuming ZFC is consistent). Sierpiński proved in 1928 that the continuum hypothesis (which is now also known to be independent of ZFC) implies the existence of uncountable strong measure zero sets. In 1976 Laver used a method of forcing to construct a model of ZFC in which Borel's conjecture holds. These two results together establish the independence of Borel's conjecture.

The following characterization of strong measure zero sets was proved in 1973:

A set A ⊆ R has strong measure zero if and only if A + M ≠ R for every meagre set M ⊆ R.

This result establishes a connection to the notion of strongly meagre set, defined as follows:

A set M ⊆ R is strongly meagre if and only if A + M ≠ R for every set A ⊆ R of Lebesgue measure zero.

The dual Borel conjecture states that every strongly meagre set is countable. This statement is also independent of ZFC.
