= Σ-compact space =

Type of topological space

In mathematics, a topological space is said to be σ-compact if it is the union of countably many compact subspaces.

A space is said to be σ-locally compact if it is both σ-compact and (weakly) locally compact. That terminology can be somewhat confusing as it does not fit the usual pattern of σ-(property) meaning a countable union of spaces satisfying (property); that's why such spaces are more commonly referred to explicitly as σ-compact (weakly) locally compact, which is also equivalent to being exhaustible by compact sets.

== Properties and examples ==
- Every compact space is σ-compact, and every σ-compact space is Lindelöf (i.e. every open cover has a countable subcover). The reverse implications do not hold, for example, standard Euclidean space (R^{n}) is σ-compact but not compact, and the lower limit topology on the real line is Lindelöf but not σ-compact. In fact, the countable complement topology on any uncountable set is Lindelöf but neither σ-compact nor locally compact. However, it is true that any locally compact Lindelöf space is σ-compact.
- (The irrational numbers) $\mathbb R\setminus\mathbb Q$ is not σ-compact.
- A Hausdorff, Baire space that is also σ-compact, must be locally compact at at least one point.
- If G is a topological group and G is locally compact at one point, then G is locally compact everywhere. Therefore, the previous property tells us that if G is a σ-compact, Hausdorff topological group that is also a Baire space, then G is locally compact. This shows that for Hausdorff topological groups that are also Baire spaces, σ-compactness implies local compactness.
- The previous property implies for instance that R^{ω} is not σ-compact: if it were σ-compact, it would necessarily be locally compact since R^{ω} is a topological group that is also a Baire space.
- Every hemicompact space is σ-compact. The converse, however, is not true; for example, the space of rationals, with the usual topology, is σ-compact but not hemicompact.
- The product of a finite number of σ-compact spaces is σ-compact. However the product of an infinite number of σ-compact spaces may fail to be σ-compact.
- A σ-compact space X is second category (respectively Baire) if and only if the set of points at which is X is locally compact is nonempty (respectively dense) in X.

== See also ==
- Exhaustion by compact sets – in analysis, a sequence of compact sets that converges on a given set
- Lindelöf space – Type of topological space
- Locally compact space – Type of topological space in mathematics
