= Lindelöf space =

Type of topological space

In mathematics, a Lindelöf space is a topological space in which every open cover has a countable subcover. The Lindelöf property is a weakening of the more commonly used notion of compactness, which requires the existence of a finite subcover.

A hereditarily Lindelöf space is a topological space of which every subspace is Lindelöf. Such a space is sometimes called strongly Lindelöf, but that terminology is given a different meaning by some authors. The term hereditarily Lindelöf is more common and unambiguous.

Lindelöf spaces are named after the Finnish mathematician Ernst Leonard Lindelöf.

== Properties of Lindelöf spaces ==
- Every compact space, and more generally every σ-compact space, is Lindelöf. In particular, every countable space is Lindelöf.
- A Lindelöf space is compact if and only if it is countably compact.
- Every second-countable space is Lindelöf, but not conversely. For example, there are many compact spaces that are not second-countable.
- A metric space is Lindelöf if and only if it is separable, and if and only if it is second-countable.
- Every regular Lindelöf space is normal.
- Every regular Lindelöf space is paracompact.
- A countable union of Lindelöf subspaces of a topological space is Lindelöf.
- Every closed subspace of a Lindelöf space is Lindelöf. Consequently, every F_{σ} set in a Lindelöf space is Lindelöf.
- Arbitrary subspaces of a Lindelöf space need not be Lindelöf.
- The continuous image of a Lindelöf space is Lindelöf.
- The product of a Lindelöf space and a compact space is Lindelöf.
- The product of a Lindelöf space and a σ-compact space is Lindelöf. This is a corollary to the previous property.
- The product of two Lindelöf spaces need not be Lindelöf. For example, the Sorgenfrey line $S$ is Lindelöf, but the Sorgenfrey plane $S \times S$ is not Lindelöf.
- In a Lindelöf space, every locally finite family of nonempty subsets is at most countable.

== Properties of hereditarily Lindelöf spaces ==
- A space is hereditarily Lindelöf if and only if every open subspace of it is Lindelöf.
- Hereditarily Lindelöf spaces are closed under taking countable unions, subspaces, and continuous images.
- A regular Lindelöf space is hereditarily Lindelöf if and only if it is perfectly normal.
- Every second-countable space is hereditarily Lindelöf.
- Every countable space is hereditarily Lindelöf.
- Every Suslin space is hereditarily Lindelöf.
- Every Radon measure on a hereditarily Lindelöf space is moderated.

== Example: the Sorgenfrey plane is not Lindelöf ==
The product of Lindelöf spaces is not necessarily Lindelöf. The usual example of this is the Sorgenfrey plane $\mathbb{S},$ which is the product of the real line $\Reals$ under the half-open interval topology with itself. Open sets in the Sorgenfrey plane are unions of half-open rectangles that include the south and west edges and omit the north and east edges, including the northwest, northeast, and southeast corners. The antidiagonal of $\mathbb{S}$ is the set of points $(x, y)$ such that $x + y = 0.$

Consider the open covering of $\mathbb{S}$ which consists of:

1. The set of all rectangles $(-\infty, x) \times (-\infty,y),$ where $(x, y)$ is on the antidiagonal.
2. The set of all rectangles $[x, +\infty) \times [y,+\infty),$ where $(x, y)$ is on the antidiagonal.

The thing to notice here is that each point on the antidiagonal is contained in exactly one set of the covering, so all the (uncountably many) sets of item (2) above are needed.

Another way to see that $S$ is not Lindelöf is to note that the antidiagonal defines a closed and uncountable discrete subspace of $S.$ This subspace is not Lindelöf, and so the whole space cannot be Lindelöf either (as closed subspaces of Lindelöf spaces are also Lindelöf).

== Generalisation ==
The following definition generalises the definitions of compact and Lindelöf: a topological space is $\kappa$-compact (or $\kappa$-Lindelöf), where $\kappa$ is any cardinal, if every open cover has a subcover of cardinality strictly less than $\kappa$. Compact is then $\aleph_0$-compact and Lindelöf is then $\aleph_1$-compact.

The Lindelöf degree, or Lindelöf number $l(X),$ is the smallest cardinal $\kappa$ such that every open cover of the space $X$ has a subcover of size at most $\kappa.$ In this notation, $X$ is Lindelöf if $l(X) = \aleph_0.$ The Lindelöf number as defined above does not distinguish between compact spaces and Lindelöf non-compact spaces. Some authors gave the name Lindelöf number to a different notion: the smallest cardinal $\kappa$ such that every open cover of the space $X$ has a subcover of size strictly less than $\kappa.$ In this latter (and less used) sense the Lindelöf number is the smallest cardinal $\kappa$ such that a topological space $X$ is $\kappa$-compact. This notion is sometimes also called the compactness degree of the space $X.$

== See also ==
- Axioms of countability
- Lindelöf's lemma
