= Glossary of general topology =

This is a glossary of some terms used in the branch of mathematics known as topology. Although there is no absolute distinction between different areas of topology, the focus here is on general topology. The following definitions are also fundamental to algebraic topology, differential topology and geometric topology. For a list of terms specific to algebraic topology, see Glossary of algebraic topology.

All spaces in this glossary are assumed to be topological spaces unless stated otherwise.

== A ==
Absolutely closed
See H-closed

Accessible
See $T_1$.

Accumulation point
See limit point.

Alexandroff compactification

Alexandrov topology
The topology of a space X is an Alexandrov topology (or is finitely generated) if arbitrary intersections of open sets in X are open, or equivalently, if arbitrary unions of closed sets are closed, or, again equivalently, if the open sets are the upper sets of a poset.

Almost discrete
A space is almost discrete if every open set is closed (hence clopen). The almost discrete spaces are precisely the finitely generated zero-dimensional spaces.

α-closed, α-open
A subset A of a topological space X is α-open if $A \subseteq \operatorname{Int}_X \left( \operatorname{Cl}_X \left( \operatorname{Int}_X A \right) \right)$, and the complement of such a set is α-closed.

Approach space
An approach space is a generalization of metric space based on point-to-set distances, instead of point-to-point.

== B ==
Baire space
This has two distinct common meanings:
1. A space is a Baire space if the intersection of any countable collection of dense open sets is dense; see Baire space.
2. Baire space is the set of all functions from the natural numbers to the natural numbers, with the topology of pointwise convergence; see Baire space (set theory).

Base
A collection B of open sets is a base (or basis) for a topology $\tau$ if every open set in $\tau$ is a union of sets in $B$. The topology $\tau$ is the smallest topology on $X$ containing $B$ and is said to be generated by $B$.

Basis
See Base.

β-open
See Semi-preopen.

b-open, b-closed
A subset $A$ of a topological space $X$ is b-open if $A \subseteq \operatorname{Int}_X \left( \operatorname{Cl}_X A \right) \cup \operatorname{Cl}_X \left( \operatorname{Int}_X A \right)$. The complement of a b-open set is b-closed.

Borel algebra
The Borel algebra on a topological space $(X,\tau)$ is the smallest $\sigma$-algebra containing all the open sets. It is obtained by taking intersection of all $\sigma$-algebras on $X$ containing $\tau$.

Borel set
A Borel set is an element of a Borel algebra.

Boundary
The boundary (or frontier) of a set is the set's closure minus its interior. Equivalently, the boundary of a set is the intersection of its closure with the closure of its complement. Boundary of a set $A$ is denoted by $\partial A$ or $bd$ $A$.

Bounded
A set in a metric space is bounded if it has finite diameter. Equivalently, a set is bounded if it is contained in some open ball of finite radius. A function taking values in a metric space is bounded if its image is a bounded set.

== C ==
Category of topological spaces
The category Top has topological spaces as objects and continuous maps as morphisms.

Cauchy sequence
A sequence {x_{n}} in a metric space (M, d) is a Cauchy sequence if, for every positive real number r, there is an integer N such that for all integers m, n > N, we have d(x_{m}, x_{n}) < r.

Clopen set
A set is clopen if it is both open and closed.

Closed ball
If (M, d) is a metric space, a closed ball is a set of the form D(x; r) := {y in M : d(x, y) ≤ r}, where x is in M and r is a positive real number, the radius of the ball. A closed ball of radius r is a closed r-ball. Every closed ball is a closed set in the topology induced on M by d. Note that the closed ball D(x; r) might not be equal to the closure of the open ball B(x; r).

Closed set
A set is closed if its complement is a member of the topology.

Closed function
A function from one space to another is closed if the image of every closed set is closed.

Closure
The closure of a set is the smallest closed set containing the original set. It is equal to the intersection of all closed sets which contain it. An element of the closure of a set S is a point of closure of S.

Closure operator
See Kuratowski closure axioms.

Coarser topology
If X is a set, and if T_{1} and T_{2} are topologies on X, then T_{1} is coarser (or smaller, weaker) than T_{2} if T_{1} is contained in T_{2}. Beware, some authors, especially analysts, use the term stronger.

Comeagre
A subset A of a space X is comeagre (comeager) if its complement X\A is meagre. Also called residual.

Compact
A space is compact if every open cover has a finite subcover. Every compact space is Lindelöf and paracompact. Therefore, every compact Hausdorff space is normal. See also quasicompact.

Compact-open topology
The compact-open topology on the set C(X, Y) of all continuous maps between two spaces X and Y is defined as follows: given a compact subset K of X and an open subset U of Y, let V(K, U) denote the set of all maps f in C(X, Y) such that f(K) is contained in U. Then the collection of all such V(K, U) is a subbase for the compact-open topology.

Complete
A metric space is complete if every Cauchy sequence converges.

Completely metrizable/completely metrisable
See complete space.

Completely normal
A space is completely normal if any two separated sets have disjoint neighbourhoods.

Completely normal Hausdorff
A completely normal Hausdorff space (or T_{5} space) is a completely normal T_{1} space. (A completely normal space is Hausdorff if and only if it is T_{1}, so the terminology is consistent.) Every completely normal Hausdorff space is normal Hausdorff.

Completely regular
A space is completely regular if, whenever C is a closed set and x is a point not in C, then C and {x} are functionally separated.

Completely T_{3}
See Tychonoff.

Component
See Connected component/Path-connected component.

Connected
A space is connected if it is not the union of a pair of disjoint nonempty open sets. Equivalently, a space is connected if the only clopen sets are the whole space and the empty set.

Connected component
A connected component of a space is a maximal nonempty connected subspace. Each connected component is closed, and the set of connected components of a space is a partition of that space.

Continuous
A function from one space to another is continuous if the preimage of every open set is open.

Continuum
A space is called a continuum if it a compact, connected Hausdorff space.

Contractible
A space X is contractible if the identity map on X is homotopic to a constant map. Every contractible space is simply connected.

Coproduct topology
If {X_{i}} is a collection of spaces and X is the (set-theoretic) disjoint union of {X_{i}}, then the coproduct topology (or disjoint union topology, topological sum of the X_{i}) on X is the finest topology for which all the injection maps are continuous.

Core-compact space

Cosmic space
A continuous image of some separable metric space.

Countable chain condition
A space X satisfies the countable chain condition if every family of non-empty, pairswise disjoint open sets is countable.

Countably compact
A space is countably compact if every countable open cover has a finite subcover. Every countably compact space is pseudocompact and weakly countably compact.

Countably locally finite
A collection of subsets of a space X is countably locally finite (or σ-locally finite) if it is the union of a countable collection of locally finite collections of subsets of X.

Cover
A collection of subsets of a space is a cover (or covering) of that space if the union of the collection is the whole space.

Covering
See Cover.

Cut point
If X is a connected space with more than one point, then a point x of X is a cut point if the subspace X − {x} is disconnected.

== D ==
δ-cluster point, δ-closed, δ-open
A point x of a topological space X is a δ-cluster point of a subset A if $A \cap \operatorname{Int}_X\left( \operatorname{Cl}_X(U) \right) \neq \emptyset$ for every open neighborhood U of x in X. The subset A is δ-closed if it is equal to the set of its δ-cluster points, and δ-open if its complement is δ-closed.

Dense set
A set is dense if it has nonempty intersection with every nonempty open set. Equivalently, a set is dense if its closure is the whole space.

Dense-in-itself set
A set is dense-in-itself if it has no isolated point.

Density
the minimal cardinality of a dense subset of a topological space. A set of density ℵ_{0} is a separable space.

Derived set
If X is a space and S is a subset of X, the derived set of S in X is the set of limit points of S in X.

Developable space
A topological space with a development.

Development
A countable collection of open covers of a topological space, such that for any closed set C and any point p in its complement there exists a cover in the collection such that every neighbourhood of p in the cover is disjoint from C.

Diameter
If (M, d) is a metric space and S is a subset of M, the diameter of S is the supremum of the distances d(x, y), where x and y range over S.

Discrete metric
The discrete metric on a set X is the function d : X × X → R such that for all x, y in X, d(x, x) = 0 and d(x, y) = 1 if x ≠ y. The discrete metric induces the discrete topology on X.

Discrete space
A space X is discrete if every subset of X is open. We say that X carries the discrete topology.

Discrete topology
See discrete space.

Disjoint union topology
See Coproduct topology.

Dispersion point
If X is a connected space with more than one point, then a point x of X is a dispersion point if the subspace X − {x} is hereditarily disconnected (its only connected components are the one-point sets).

Distance
See metric space.

Dowker space

Dugundji extension theorem

Dunce hat (topology)

== E ==
Entourage
See Uniform space.

Exterior
The exterior of a set is the interior of its complement.

Eilenberg–Wojdysławski theorem
The Eilenberg–Wojdysławski theorem says every bounded metric space can be embedded into a Banach space as a closed subset of the convex hull of the image.

== F ==
F_{σ} set
An F_{σ} set is a countable union of closed sets.

Filter
See also: Filters in topology. A filter on a space X is a nonempty family F of subsets of X such that the following conditions hold:
1. The empty set is not in F.
2. The intersection of any finite number of elements of F is again in F.
3. If A is in F and if B contains A, then B is in F.

Final topology
On a set X with respect to a family of functions into $X$, is the finest topology on X which makes those functions continuous.

Fine topology (potential theory)
On Euclidean space $\R^n$, the coarsest topology making all subharmonic functions (equivalently all superharmonic functions) continuous.

Finer topology
If X is a set, and if T_{1} and T_{2} are topologies on X, then T_{2} is finer (or larger, stronger) than T_{1} if T_{2} contains T_{1}. Beware, some authors, especially analysts, use the term weaker.

Finitely generated
See Alexandrov topology.

First category
See Meagre.

First-countable
A space is first-countable if every point has a countable local base.

Fréchet
See T_{1}.

Frontier
See Boundary.

Full set
A compact subset K of the complex plane is called full if its complement is connected. For example, the closed unit disk is full, while the unit circle is not.

Functionally separated
Two sets A and B in a space X are functionally separated if there is a continuous map f: X → [0, 1] such that f(A) = 0 and f(B) = 1.

== G ==
G_{δ} set
A G_{δ} set or inner limiting set is a countable intersection of open sets.

G_{δ} space
A space in which every closed set is a G_{δ} set.

Generic point
A generic point for a closed set is a point for which the closed set is the closure of the singleton set containing that point.

== H ==
Hausdorff
A Hausdorff space (or T_{2} space) is one in which every two distinct points have disjoint neighbourhoods. Every Hausdorff space is T_{1}.
H-closed
A space is H-closed, or Hausdorff closed or absolutely closed, if it is closed in every Hausdorff space containing it.
Hemicompact
A space is hemicompact, if there is a sequence of compact subsets so that every compact subset is contained in one of them.
Hereditarily P
A space is hereditarily P for some property P if every subspace is also P.
Hereditary
A property of spaces is said to be hereditary if whenever a space has that property, then so does every subspace of it. For example, second-countability is a hereditary property.
Homeomorphism
If X and Y are spaces, a homeomorphism from X to Y is a bijective function f : X → Y such that f and f^{−1} are continuous. The spaces X and Y are then said to be homeomorphic. From the standpoint of topology, homeomorphic spaces are identical.
Homogeneous
A space X is homogeneous if, for every x and y in X, there is a homeomorphism f : X → X such that f(x) = y. Intuitively, the space looks the same at every point. Every topological group is homogeneous.
Homotopic maps
Two continuous maps f, g : X → Y are homotopic (in Y) if there is a continuous map H : X × [0, 1] → Y such that H(x, 0) = f(x) and H(x, 1) = g(x) for all x in X. Here, X × [0, 1] is given the product topology. The function H is called a homotopy (in Y) between f and g.
Homotopy
See Homotopic maps.
Hyperconnected
A space is hyperconnected if no two non-empty open sets are disjoint Every hyperconnected space is connected.

== I ==
Identification map
See Quotient map.
Identification space
See Quotient space.
Indiscrete space
See Trivial topology.
Infinite-dimensional topology
See Hilbert manifold and Q-manifolds, i.e. (generalized) manifolds modelled on the Hilbert space and on the Hilbert cube respectively.
Inner limiting set
A G_{δ} set.
Interior
The interior of a set is the largest open set contained in the original set. It is equal to the union of all open sets contained in it. An element of the interior of a set S is an interior point of S.
Interior point
See Interior.
Isolated point
A point x is an isolated point if the singleton {x} is open. More generally, if S is a subset of a space X, and if x is a point of S, then x is an isolated point of S if {x} is open in the subspace topology on S.
Isometric isomorphism
If M_{1} and M_{2} are metric spaces, an isometric isomorphism from M_{1} to M_{2} is a bijective isometry f : M_{1} → M_{2}. The metric spaces are then said to be isometrically isomorphic. From the standpoint of metric space theory, isometrically isomorphic spaces are identical.
Isometry
If (M_{1}, d_{1}) and (M_{2}, d_{2}) are metric spaces, an isometry from M_{1} to M_{2} is a function f : M_{1} → M_{2} such that d_{2}(f(x), f(y)) = d_{1}(x, y) for all x, y in M_{1}. Every isometry is injective, although not every isometry is surjective.

== K ==
Koch's arc theorem

Kolmogorov axiom
See T_{0}.

Kuratowski closure axioms
The Kuratowski closure axioms is a set of axioms satisfied by the function which takes each subset of X to its closure:
1. Isotonicity: Every set is contained in its closure.
2. Idempotence: The closure of the closure of a set is equal to the closure of that set.
3. Preservation of binary unions: The closure of the union of two sets is the union of their closures.
4. Preservation of nullary unions: The closure of the empty set is empty.
If c is a function from the power set of X to itself, then c is a closure operator if it satisfies the Kuratowski closure axioms. The Kuratowski closure axioms can then be used to define a topology on X by declaring the closed sets to be the fixed points of this operator, i.e. a set A is closed if and only if c(A) = A.

Kolmogorov topology
T_{Kol} = {R, $\varnothing$}∪{(a,∞): a is real number}; the pair (R,T_{Kol}) is named Kolmogorov Straight.

== L ==
L-space
An L-space is a hereditarily Lindelöf space which is not hereditarily separable. A Suslin line would be an L-space.

Larger topology
See Finer topology.

Limit point
A point x in a space X is a limit point of a subset S if every open set containing x also contains a point of S other than x itself. This is equivalent to requiring that every neighbourhood of x contains a point of S other than x itself.

Limit point compact
See Weakly countably compact.

Limit space

Lindelöf
A space is Lindelöf if every open cover has a countable subcover.

Local base
A set B of neighbourhoods of a point x of a space X is a local base (or local basis, neighbourhood base, neighbourhood basis) at x if every neighbourhood of x contains some member of B.

Local basis
See Local base.

Locally (P) space
There are two definitions for a space to be "locally (P)" where (P) is a topological or set-theoretic property: that each point has a neighbourhood with property (P), or that every point has a neighourbood base for which each member has property (P). The first definition is usually taken for locally compact, countably compact, metrizable, separable, countable; the second for locally connected.

Locally closed subset
A subset of a topological space that is the intersection of an open and a closed subset. Equivalently, it is a relatively open subset of its closure.

Locally compact
A space is locally compact if every point has a compact neighbourhood: the alternative definition that each point has a local base consisting of compact neighbourhoods is sometimes used: these are equivalent for Hausdorff spaces. Every locally compact Hausdorff space is Tychonoff.

Locally connected
A space is locally connected if every point has a local base consisting of connected neighbourhoods.

Locally dense
see Preopen.

Locally finite
A collection of subsets of a space is locally finite if every point has a neighbourhood which has nonempty intersection with only finitely many of the subsets. See also countably locally finite, point finite.

Locally metrizable/Locally metrisable
A space is locally metrizable if every point has a metrizable neighbourhood.

Locally path-connected
A space is locally path-connected if every point has a local base consisting of path-connected neighbourhoods. A locally path-connected space is connected if and only if it is path-connected.

Locally simply connected
A space is locally simply connected if every point has a local base consisting of simply connected neighbourhoods.

Loop
If x is a point in a space X, a loop at x in X (or a loop in X with basepoint x) is a path f in X, such that f(0) = f(1) = x. Equivalently, a loop in X is a continuous map from the unit circle S^{1} into X.

== M ==
Meagre
If X is a space and A is a subset of X, then A is meagre in X (or of first category in X) if it is the countable union of nowhere dense sets. If A is not meagre in X, A is of second category in X.

Metacompact
A space is metacompact if every open cover has a point finite open refinement.

Metric
See Metric space.

Metric invariant
A metric invariant is a property which is preserved under isometric isomorphism.

Metric map
If X and Y are metric spaces with metrics d_{X} and d_{Y} respectively, then a metric map is a function f from X to Y, such that for any points x and y in X, d_{Y}(f(x), f(y)) ≤ d_{X}(x, y). A metric map is strictly metric if the above inequality is strict for all x and y in X.

Metric space
A metric space (M, d) is a set M equipped with a function d : M × M → R satisfying the following axioms for all x, y, and z in M:
1. d(x, y) ≥ 0
2. d(x, x) = 0
3. if d(x, y) = 0 then x = y (identity of indiscernibles)
4. d(x, y) = d(y, x) (symmetry)
5. d(x, z) ≤ d(x, y) + d(y, z) (triangle inequality)

The function d is a metric on M, and d(x, y) is the distance between x and y. The collection of all open balls of M is a base for a topology on M; this is the topology on M induced by d. Every metric space is Hausdorff and paracompact (and hence normal and Tychonoff). Every metric space is first-countable.

Metrizable/Metrisable
A space is metrizable if it is homeomorphic to a metric space. Every metrizable space is Hausdorff and paracompact (and hence normal and Tychonoff). Every metrizable space is first-countable.

Monolith
Every non-empty ultra-connected compact space X has a largest proper open subset; this subset is called a monolith.

Moore space
A Moore space is a developable regular Hausdorff space.

== N ==
Nearly open
see preopen. See also: almost open map.

Neighbourhood/Neighborhood
A neighbourhood of a point x is a set containing an open set which in turn contains the point x. More generally, a neighbourhood of a set S is a set containing an open set which in turn contains the set S. A neighbourhood of a point x is thus a neighbourhood of the singleton set {x}. (Note that under this definition, the neighbourhood itself need not be open. Many authors require that neighbourhoods be open; be careful to note conventions.)

Neighbourhood base/basis
See Local base.

Neighbourhood system for a point x
A neighbourhood system at a point x in a space is the collection of all neighbourhoods of x.

Net
A net in a space X is a map from a directed set A to X. A net from A to X is usually denoted (x_{α}), where α is an index variable ranging over A. Every sequence is a net, taking A to be the directed set of natural numbers with the usual ordering.

Normal
A space is normal if any two disjoint closed sets have disjoint neighbourhoods. Every normal space admits a partition of unity.

Normal Hausdorff
A normal Hausdorff space (or T_{4} space) is a normal T_{1} space. (A normal space is Hausdorff if and only if it is T_{1}, so the terminology is consistent.) Every normal Hausdorff space is Tychonoff.

Nowhere dense
A nowhere dense set is a set whose closure has empty interior.

== O ==
Open cover
An open cover is a cover consisting of open sets.

Open ball
If (M, d) is a metric space, an open ball is a set of the form B(x; r) := {y in M : d(x, y) < r}, where x is in M and r is a positive real number, the radius of the ball. An open ball of radius r is an open r-ball. Every open ball is an open set in the topology on M induced by d.
Open condition
See open property.
Open set
An open set is a member of the topology.
Open function
A function from one space to another is open if the image of every open set is open.
Open property
A property of points in a topological space is said to be "open" if those points which possess it form an open set. Such conditions often take a common form, and that form can be said to be an open condition; for example, in metric spaces, one defines an open ball as above, and says that "strict inequality is an open condition".

Orthocompact
A space is orthocompact, if every open cover has an interior-preserving open refinement.

== P ==
Paracompact
A space is paracompact if every open cover has a locally finite open refinement. Paracompact implies metacompact. Paracompact Hausdorff spaces are normal.

Partition of unity
A partition of unity of a space X is a set of continuous functions from X to [0, 1] such that any point has a neighbourhood where all but a finite number of the functions are identically zero, and the sum of all the functions on the entire space is identically 1.

Path
A path in a space X is a continuous map f from the closed unit interval [0, 1] into X. The point f(0) is the initial point of f; the point f(1) is the terminal point of f.

Path-connected
A space X is path-connected if, for every two points x, y in X, there is a path f from x to y, i.e., a path with initial point f(0) = x and terminal point f(1) = y. Every path-connected space is connected.

Path-connected component
A path-connected component of a space is a maximal nonempty path-connected subspace. The set of path-connected components of a space is a partition of that space, which is finer than the partition into connected components. The set of path-connected components of a space X is denoted π_{0}(X).

Peano continua

Perfectly normal
a normal space which is also a G_{δ}.

π-base
A collection B of nonempty open sets is a π-base for a topology τ if every nonempty open set in τ includes a set from B.

Point
A point is an element of a topological space. More generally, a point is an element of any set with an underlying topological structure; e.g. an element of a metric space or a topological group is also a "point".

Point of closure
See Closure.

Polish
A space is Polish if it is separable and completely metrizable, i.e. if it is homeomorphic to a separable and complete metric space.

Polyadic
A space is polyadic if it is the continuous image of the power of a one-point compactification of a locally compact, non-compact Hausdorff space.

Polytopological space
A polytopological space is a set $X$ together with a family $\{\tau_i\}_{i\in I}$ of topologies on $X$ that is linearly ordered by the inclusion relation where $I$ is an arbitrary index set.

P-point
A point of a topological space is a P-point if its filter of neighbourhoods is closed under countable intersections.

Pre-compact
See Relatively compact.

Pre-open set
A subset A of a topological space X is preopen if $A \subseteq \operatorname{Int}_X \left( \operatorname{Cl}_X A \right)$.

Prodiscrete topology
The prodiscrete topology on a product A^{G} is the product topology when each factor A is given the discrete topology.

Product topology
If $\left(X_i\right)$ is a collection of spaces and X is the (set-theoretic) Cartesian product of $\left(X_i\right),$ then the product topology on X is the coarsest topology for which all the projection maps are continuous.

Proper function/mapping
A continuous function f from a space X to a space Y is proper if $f^{-1}(C)$ is a compact set in X for any compact subspace C of Y.

Proximity space
A proximity space (X, d) is a set X equipped with a binary relation d between subsets of X satisfying the following properties:

For all subsets A, B and C of X,
1. A d B implies B d A
2. A d B implies A is non-empty
3. If A and B have non-empty intersection, then A d B
4. A d (B $\cup$ C) if and only if (A d B or A d C)
5. If, for all subsets E of X, we have (A d E or B d E), then we must have A d (X − B)

Pseudocompact
A space is pseudocompact if every real-valued continuous function on the space is bounded.

Pseudometric
See Pseudometric space.

Pseudometric space
A pseudometric space (M, d) is a set M equipped with a real-valued function $d : M \times M \to \R$ satisfying all the conditions of a metric space, except possibly the identity of indiscernibles. That is, points in a pseudometric space may be "infinitely close" without being identical. The function d is a pseudometric on M. Every metric is a pseudometric.

Punctured neighbourhood/Punctured neighborhood
A punctured neighbourhood of a point x is a neighbourhood of x, minus {x}. For instance, the interval (−1, 1) = {y : −1 < y < 1} is a neighbourhood of x = 0 in the real line, so the set $(-1, 0) \cup (0, 1) = (-1, 1) - \{ 0 \}$ is a punctured neighbourhood of 0.

== Q ==
Quasicompact
See compact. Some authors define "compact" to include the Hausdorff separation axiom, and they use the term quasicompact to mean what we call in this glossary simply "compact" (without the Hausdorff axiom). This convention is most commonly found in French, and branches of mathematics heavily influenced by the French.

Quotient map
If X and Y are spaces, and if f is a surjection from X to Y, then f is a quotient map (or identification map) if, for every subset U of Y, U is open in Y if and only if f^{-1}(U) is open in X. In other words, Y has the f-strong topology. Equivalently, $f$ is a quotient map if and only if it is the transfinite composition of maps $X\rightarrow X/Z$, where $Z\subset X$ is a subset. Note that this does not imply that f is an open function.

Quotient space
If X is a space, Y is a set, and f : X → Y is any surjective function, then the Quotient topology on Y induced by f is the finest topology for which f is continuous. The space X is a quotient space or identification space. By definition, f is a quotient map. The most common example of this is to consider an equivalence relation on X, with Y the set of equivalence classes and f the natural projection map. This construction is dual to the construction of the subspace topology.

== R ==
Refinement
A cover K is a refinement of a cover L if every member of K is a subset of some member of L.
Regular
A space is regular if, whenever C is a closed set and x is a point not in C, then C and x have disjoint neighbourhoods.
Regular Hausdorff
A space is regular Hausdorff (or T_{3}) if it is a regular T_{0} space. (A regular space is Hausdorff if and only if it is T_{0}, so the terminology is consistent.)
Regular open
A subset of a space X is regular open if it equals the interior of its closure; dually, a regular closed set is equal to the closure of its interior. An example of a non-regular open set is the set U = (0,1) ∪ (1,2) in R with its normal topology, since 1 is in the interior of the closure of U, but not in U. The regular open subsets of a space form a complete Boolean algebra.
Relatively compact
A subset Y of a space X is relatively compact in X if the closure of Y in X is compact.
Residual
If X is a space and A is a subset of X, then A is residual in X if the complement of A is meagre in X. Also called comeagre or comeager.
Resolvable
A topological space is called resolvable if it is expressible as the union of two disjoint dense subsets.
Rim-compact
A space is rim-compact if it has a base of open sets whose boundaries are compact.

== S ==
S-space
An S-space is a hereditarily separable space which is not hereditarily Lindelöf.

Scattered
A space X is scattered if every nonempty subset A of X contains a point isolated in A.

Scott
The Scott topology on a poset is that in which the open sets are those Upper sets inaccessible by directed joins.

Second category
See Meagre.

Second-countable
A space is second-countable or perfectly separable if it has a countable base for its topology. Every second-countable space is first-countable, separable, and Lindelöf.

Semilocally simply connected
A space X is semilocally simply connected if, for every point x in X, there is a neighbourhood U of x such that every loop at x in U is homotopic in X to the constant loop x. Every simply connected space and every locally simply connected space is semilocally simply connected. (Compare with locally simply connected; here, the homotopy is allowed to live in X, whereas in the definition of locally simply connected, the homotopy must live in U.)

Semi-open
A subset A of a topological space X is called semi-open if $A \subseteq \operatorname{Cl}_X \left( \operatorname{Int}_X A \right)$.

Semi-preopen
A subset A of a topological space X is called semi-preopen if $A \subseteq \operatorname{Cl}_X \left( \operatorname{Int}_X \left( \operatorname{Cl}_X A \right) \right)$

Semiregular
A space is semiregular if the regular open sets form a base.

Separable
A space is separable if it has a countable dense subset.

Separated
Two sets A and B are separated if each is disjoint from the other's closure.

Sequentially compact
A space is sequentially compact if every sequence has a convergent subsequence. Every sequentially compact space is countably compact, and every first-countable, countably compact space is sequentially compact.

Short map
See metric map

Sierpiński space

Simply connected
A space is simply connected if it is path-connected and every loop is homotopic to a constant map.

Smaller topology
See Coarser topology.

Sober
In a sober space, every irreducible closed subset is the closure of exactly one point: that is, has a unique generic point.

Star
The star of a point in a given cover of a topological space is the union of all the sets in the cover that contain the point. See star refinement.

$f$-Strong topology
Let $f\colon X\rightarrow Y$ be a map of topological spaces. We say that $Y$ has the $f$-strong topology if, for every subset $U\subset Y$, one has that $U$ is open in $Y$ if and only if $f^{-1}(U)$ is open in $X$

Stronger topology
See Finer topology. Beware, some authors, especially analysts, use the term weaker topology.

Subbase
A collection of open sets is a subbase (or subbasis) for a topology if every non-empty proper open set in the topology is the union of a finite intersection of sets in the subbase. If $\mathcal B$ is any collection of subsets of a set X, the topology on X generated by $\mathcal B$ is the smallest topology containing $\mathcal B;$ this topology consists of the empty set, X and all unions of finite intersections of elements of $\mathcal B.$ Thus $\mathcal B$ is a subbase for the topology it generates.

Subbasis
See Subbase.

Subcover
A cover K is a subcover (or subcovering) of a cover L if every member of K is a member of L.

Subcovering
See Subcover.
Submaximal space
A topological space is said to be submaximal if every subset of it is locally closed, that is, every subset is the intersection of an open set and a closed set.

Here are some facts about submaximality as a property of topological spaces:

- Every door space is submaximal.
- Every submaximal space is weakly submaximal viz every finite set is locally closed.
- Every submaximal space is irresolvable.

Subspace
If T is a topology on a space X, and if A is a subset of X, then the subspace topology on A induced by T consists of all intersections of open sets in T with A. This construction is dual to the construction of the quotient topology.

Suslin line

== T ==
T_{0}
A space is T_{0} (or Kolmogorov) if for every pair of distinct points x and y in the space, either there is an open set containing x but not y, or there is an open set containing y but not x.

T_{1}
A space is T_{1} (or Fréchet or accessible) if for every pair of distinct points x and y in the space, there is an open set containing x but not y. (Compare with T_{0}; here, we are allowed to specify which point will be contained in the open set.) Equivalently, a space is T_{1} if all its singletons are closed. Every T_{1} space is T_{0}.

T_{2}
See Hausdorff space.

T_{3}
See Regular Hausdorff.

T_{3½}
See Tychonoff space.

T_{4}
See Normal Hausdorff.

T_{5}
See Completely normal Hausdorff.

Top
See Category of topological spaces.

θ-cluster point, θ-closed, θ-open
A point x of a topological space X is a θ-cluster point of a subset A if $A \cap \operatorname{Cl}_X(U) \neq \emptyset$ for every open neighborhood U of x in X. The subset A is θ-closed if it is equal to the set of its θ-cluster points, and θ-open if its complement is θ-closed.

Topological invariant
A topological invariant is a property which is preserved under homeomorphism. For example, compactness and connectedness are topological properties, whereas boundedness and completeness are not. Algebraic topology is the study of topologically invariant abstract algebra constructions on topological spaces.

Topological space
A topological space (X, T) is a set X equipped with a collection T of subsets of X satisfying the following axioms:

1. The empty set and X are in T.
2. The union of any collection of sets in T is also in T.
3. The intersection of any pair of sets in T is also in T.

The collection T is a topology on X.

Topological sum
See Coproduct topology.

Topologically complete
Completely metrizable spaces (i. e. topological spaces homeomorphic to complete metric spaces) are often called topologically complete; sometimes the term is also used for Čech-complete spaces or completely uniformizable spaces.

Topology
See Topological space.

Totally bounded
A metric space M is totally bounded if, for every r > 0, there exist a finite cover of M by open balls of radius r. A metric space is compact if and only if it is complete and totally bounded.

Totally disconnected
A space is totally disconnected if it has no connected subset with more than one point.

Trivial topology
The trivial topology (or indiscrete topology) on a set X consists of precisely the empty set and the entire space X.

Tychonoff
A Tychonoff space (or completely regular Hausdorff space, completely T_{3} space, T_{3.5} space) is a completely regular T_{0} space. (A completely regular space is Hausdorff if and only if it is T_{0}, so the terminology is consistent.) Every Tychonoff space is regular Hausdorff.

== U ==
Ultra-connected
A space is ultra-connected if no two non-empty closed sets are disjoint. Every ultra-connected space is path-connected.

Ultrametric
A metric is an ultrametric if it satisfies the following stronger version of the triangle inequality: for all x, y, z in M, d(x, z) ≤ max(d(x, y), d(y, z)).

Uniform isomorphism
If X and Y are uniform spaces, a uniform isomorphism from X to Y is a bijective function f : X → Y such that f and f^{−1} are uniformly continuous. The spaces are then said to be uniformly isomorphic and share the same uniform properties.

Uniformizable/Uniformisable
A space is uniformizable if it is homeomorphic to a uniform space.

Uniform space
A uniform space is a set X equipped with a nonempty collection Φ of subsets of the Cartesian product X × X satisfying the following axioms:

1. if U is in Φ, then U contains { (x, x) | x in X }.
2. if U is in Φ, then { (y, x) | (x, y) in U } is also in Φ
3. if U is in Φ and V is a subset of X × X which contains U, then V is in Φ
4. if U and V are in Φ, then U ∩ V is in Φ
5. if U is in Φ, then there exists V in Φ such that, whenever (x, y) and (y, z) are in V, then (x, z) is in U.

The elements of Φ are called entourages, and Φ itself is called a uniform structure on X. The uniform structure induces a topology on X where the basic neighborhoods of x are sets of the form {y : (x,y)∈U} for U∈Φ.

Uniform structure
See Uniform space.

== V ==
Vietoris
Vietoris topology

== W ==
Weak topology
The weak topology on a set, with respect to a collection of functions from that set into topological spaces, is the coarsest topology on the set which makes all the functions continuous.
Weaker topology
See Coarser topology. Beware, some authors, especially analysts, use the term stronger topology.
Weakly countably compact
A space is weakly countably compact (or limit point compact) if every infinite subset has a limit point.
Weakly hereditary
A property of spaces is said to be weakly hereditary if whenever a space has that property, then so does every closed subspace of it. For example, compactness and the Lindelöf property are both weakly hereditary properties, although neither is hereditary.
Weight
The weight of a space X is the smallest cardinal number κ such that X has a base of cardinal κ. (Note that such a cardinal number exists, because the entire topology forms a base, and because the class of cardinal numbers is well-ordered.)
Well-connected
See Ultra-connected. (Some authors use this term strictly for ultra-connected compact spaces.)

== Z ==
Zero-dimensional
A space is zero-dimensional if it has a base of clopen sets.

== See also ==
- Naive set theory, Axiomatic set theory, and Function for definitions concerning sets and functions.
- Topology for a brief history and description of the subject area
- Topological spaces for basic definitions and examples
- List of general topology topics
- List of examples in general topology

Topology specific concepts

- Compact space
- Connected space
- Continuity
- Metric space
- Separated sets
- Separation axiom
- Topological space
- Uniform space

Other glossaries

- Glossary of algebraic topology
- Glossary of differential geometry and topology
- Glossary of areas of mathematics
- Glossary of Riemannian and metric geometry
