= Integer broom topology =

In general topology, a branch of mathematics, the integer broom topology is an example of a topology on the so-called integer broom space X.

== Definition of the integer broom space ==
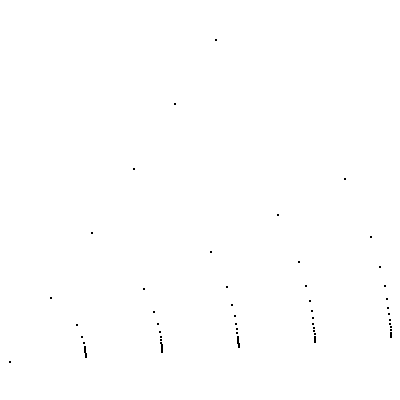
A subset of the integer broom

The integer broom space X is a subset of the plane R^{2}. Assume that the plane is parametrised by polar coordinates. The integer broom contains the origin and the points (n, θ) ∈ R^{2} such that n is a non-negative integer and θ ∈ {1/k : k ∈ Z^{+}}, where Z^{+} is the set of positive integers. The image on the right gives an illustration for 0 ≤ n ≤ 5 and 1/15 ≤ θ ≤ 1. Geometrically, the space consists of a collection of convergent sequences. For a fixed n, we have a sequence of points − lying on circle with centre (0, 0) and radius n − that converges to the point (n, 0).

== Definition of the integer broom topology ==
We define the topology on X by means of a product topology. The integer broom space is given by the polar coordinates
$$(n, \theta) \in \{ n \in \Z : n \ge 0 \} \times \{ \theta = 1/k : k \in \Z^{+} \} \, .$$
Let us write (n,θ) ∈ U × V for simplicity. The integer broom topology on X is the product topology induced by giving U the right order topology, and V the subspace topology from R.

== Properties ==
The integer broom space, together with the integer broom topology, is a compact topological space. It is a T_{0} space, but it is neither a T_{1} space nor a Hausdorff space. The space is path connected, while neither locally connected nor arc connected.

== See also ==
- Comb space
- Infinite broom
- List of topologies
