= Comb space =

Pathological topological space

In mathematics, particularly topology, a comb space is a particular subspace of $\R^2$ that resembles a comb. The comb space has properties that serve as a number of counterexamples. The topologist's sine curve has similar properties to the comb space. The deleted comb space is a variation on the comb space.

Topologist's comb

The intricated double comb for r=3/4.

== Formal definition ==
Consider $\R^2$ with its standard topology and let K be the set $\{1/n ~|~ n \in \mathbb N\}$. The set C defined by:

$$(\{0\} \times [0,1] ) \cup (K \times [0,1]) \cup ([0,1] \times \{0\})$$

considered as a subspace of $\R^2$ equipped with the subspace topology is known as the comb space. The deleted comb space, D, is defined by:

$$(\{0\} \times \{1 \}) \cup (K \times [0,1]) \cup ([0,1] \times \{0\})$$.

This is the comb space with the line segment $\{0\} \times (0,1)$ deleted.

== Topological properties ==
The comb space and the deleted comb space have some interesting topological properties mostly related to the notion of connectedness.

- The comb space, C, is path connected and contractible, but not locally contractible, locally path connected, or locally connected.
- The deleted comb space, D, is connected:
  Let E be the comb space without $\{0\} \times (0,1]$. E is also path connected and the closure of E is the comb space. As E $\subset$ D $\subset$ the closure of E, where E is connected, the deleted comb space is also connected.
- The deleted comb space is not path connected since there is no path from (0,1) to (0,0):
  Suppose there is a path from p = (0, 1) to the point (0, 0) in D. Let f : [0, 1] → D be this path. We shall prove that f^{−1}{p} is both open and closed in [0, 1] contradicting the connectedness of this set. Clearly we have f^{−1}{p} is closed in [0, 1] by the continuity of f. To prove that f^{−1}{p} is open, we proceed as follows: Choose a neighbourhood V (open in R^{2}) about p that doesn't intersect the x–axis. Suppose x is an arbitrary point in f^{−1}{p}. Clearly, f(x) = p. Then since f^{−1}(V) is open, there is a basis element U containing x such that f(U) is a subset of V. We assert that f(U) = {p} which will mean that U is an open subset of f^{−1}{p} containing x. Since x was arbitrary, f^{−1}{p} will then be open. We know that U is connected since it is a basis element for the order topology on [0, 1]. Therefore, f(U) is connected. Suppose f(U) contains a point s other than p. Then s = (1/n, z) must belong to D. Choose r such that 1/(n + 1) < r < 1/n. Since f(U) does not intersect the x-axis, the sets A = (−∞, r) × $\R$ and B = (r, +∞) × $\R$ will form a separation on f(U); contradicting the connectedness of f(U). Therefore, f^{−1}{p} is both open and closed in [0, 1]. This is a contradiction.
- The comb space is homotopic to a point but does not admit a strong deformation retract onto a point for every choice of basepoint that lies in the segment $\{0\} \times (0,1]$

== See also ==
- Connected space
- Hedgehog space
- Infinite broom
- List of topologies
- Locally connected space
- Order topology
- Topologist's sine curve
