= Infinite broom =

Classic counterexample in topology

Standard infinite broom

In topology, a branch of mathematics, the infinite broom is a subset of the Euclidean plane that is used as an example distinguishing various notions of connectedness. The closed infinite broom is the closure of the infinite broom, and is also referred to as the broom space.

== Definition ==
The infinite broom is the subset of the Euclidean plane that consists of all closed line segments joining the origin to the point (1, 1/n) as n varies over all positive integers, together with the interval (½, 1] on the x-axis.

The closed infinite broom is then the infinite broom together with the interval (0, ½] on the x-axis. In other words, it consists of all closed line segments joining the origin to the point (1, 1/n) or to the point (1, 0).

== Properties ==
Both the infinite broom and its closure are connected, as every open set in the plane which contains the segment on the x-axis must intersect slanted segments. Neither is locally connected. Despite the closed infinite broom being arc connected, the standard infinite broom is not path connected.

The interval [0,1] on the x-axis is a deformation retract of the closed infinite broom, but it is not a strong deformation retract.

== See also ==
- Comb space
- Integer broom topology
- List of topologies
