= Path space =

In mathematics, the term path space refers to any topological space of paths from one specified set into another. In particular, it may refer to:

- The classical Wiener space of continuous paths
- The Skorokhod space of càdlàg paths
- For the usage in algebraic topology, see path space (algebraic topology). For Moore's path space, see path space fibration#Moore's path space.

See also: loop space, the space of loops in a topological space
