= Hawaiian earring =

Topological space defined by the union of circles

The Hawaiian earring.

In mathematics, the Hawaiian earring $\mathbb{H}$ is the topological space defined by the union of circles in the Euclidean plane $\R^2$ with center $\left(\tfrac{1}{n},0\right)$ and radius $\tfrac{1}{n}$ for $n = 1, 2, 3, \ldots$ endowed with the subspace topology:

$$\mathbb{H}=\bigcup_{n=1}^{\infty}\left\{(x,y)\in\mathbb{R}^2\mid\left(x-\frac{1}{n}\right)^2+y^2=\left(\frac{1}{n}\right)^2\right\}.$$

The space $\mathbb{H}$ is homeomorphic to the one-point compactification of the union of a countable family of disjoint open intervals.

The Hawaiian earring is a one-dimensional, compact, locally path-connected metrizable space. Although $\mathbb{H}$ is locally homeomorphic to $\R$ at all non-origin points, $\mathbb{H}$ is not semi-locally simply connected at $(0,0)$. Therefore, $\mathbb{H}$ does not have a simply connected covering space and is usually given as the simplest example of a space with this complication.

The Hawaiian earring looks very similar to the wedge sum of countably infinitely many circles; that is, the rose with infinitely many petals, but these two spaces are not homeomorphic. The difference between their topologies is seen in the fact that, in the Hawaiian earring, every open neighborhood of the point of intersection of the circles contains all but finitely many of the circles (an $\varepsilon$-ball around (0, 0) contains every circle whose radius is less than $\varepsilon/2$); in the rose, a neighborhood of the intersection point might not fully contain any of the circles. Additionally, the rose is not compact: the complement of the distinguished point is an infinite union of open intervals; to those add a small open neighborhood of the distinguished point to get an open cover with no finite subcover.

== Fundamental group ==
The Hawaiian earring is neither simply connected nor semilocally simply connected since, for all $n\geq 1,$ the loop $\ell_n$ parameterizing the $n$-th circle is not homotopic to a trivial loop. Thus, $\mathbb{H}$ has a nontrivial fundamental group $G=\pi_1(\mathbb{H},(0,0)),$ sometimes referred to as the Hawaiian earring group. The Hawaiian earring group $G$ is uncountable, and it is not a free group. However, $G$ is locally free in the sense that every finitely generated subgroup of $G$ is free.

The homotopy classes of the individual loops $\ell_n$ generate the free group $\langle [\ell_n]\mid n\geq 1\rangle$ on a countably infinite number of generators, which forms a proper subgroup of $G$. The uncountably many other elements of $G$ arise from loops whose image is not contained in finitely many of the Hawaiian earring's circles; in fact, some of them are surjective. For example, the path that on the interval $[ 2^{-n}, 2^{-n+1} ]$ circumnavigates the nth circle. More generally, one may form infinite products of the loops $\ell_n$ indexed over any countable linear order provided that for each $n\geq 1$, the loop $\ell_n$ and its inverse appear within the product only finitely many times.

It is a result of John Morgan and Ian Morrison that $G$ embeds into the inverse limit $\varprojlim F_n$ of the free groups with n generators, $F_n$, where the bonding map from $F_n$ to $F_{n-1}$ simply kills the last generator of $F_n$. However, $G$ is a proper subgroup of the inverse limit since each loop in $\mathbb{H}$ may traverse each circle of $\mathbb{H}$ only finitely many times. An example of an element of the inverse limit that does not correspond to an element of $G$ is an infinite product of commutators $\prod_{n=2}^{\infty}[\ell_1\ell_n\ell_{1}^{-1}\ell_{n}^{-1}]$, which appears formally as the sequence $\left(1,[\ell_1] [\ell_2] [\ell_{1}]^{-1}[\ell_{2}]^{-1},[\ell_1] [\ell_2] [\ell_{1}]^{-1}[\ell_{2}]^{-1}[\ell_1] [\ell_3] [\ell_{1}]^{-1}[\ell_{3}]^{-1},\dots\right)$ in the inverse limit $\varprojlim F_n$.

== First singular homology ==
Katsuya Eda and Kazuhiro Kawamura proved that the abelianisation of $G,$ and therefore the first singular homology group $H_1(\mathbb{H})$ is isomorphic to the group

$$\left(\prod_{i=1}^\infty \Z\right) \oplus \left(\prod_{i=1}^\infty \Z\Big/ \bigoplus_{i=1}^{\infty}\Z\right).$$

The first summand $\prod_{i=1}^\infty \Z,$ is the direct product of infinitely many copies of the infinite cyclic group (the Baer–Specker group). This factor represents the singular homology classes of loops that do not have winding number $0$ around every circle of $\mathbb{H}$ and is precisely the first Čech singular homology group $\check{H}_1(\mathbb{H})$. Additionally, $\prod_{i=1}^\infty \Z,$ may be considered as the infinite abelianization of $G$, since every element in the kernel of the natural homomorphism $G\to\prod_{i=1}^\infty \Z$ is represented by an infinite product of commutators. The second summand of $H_1(\mathbb{H})$ consists of homology classes represented by loops whose winding number around every circle of $\mathbb{H}$ is zero, i.e. the kernel of the natural homomorphism $H_1(\mathbb{H})\to\prod_{i=1}^{\infty}\mathbb{Z}$. The existence of the isomorphism with $\prod_{i=1}^\infty \Z \Big/ \bigoplus_{i=1}^{\infty}\Z$ is proven abstractly using infinite abelian group theory and does not have a geometric interpretation.

== Higher dimensions ==
It is known that $\mathbb{H}$ is an aspherical space, i.e. all higher homotopy and homology groups of $\mathbb{H}$ are trivial.

The Hawaiian earring can be generalized to higher dimensions. Such a generalization was used by Michael Barratt and John Milnor to provide examples of compact, finite-dimensional spaces with nontrivial singular homology groups in dimensions larger than that of the space. The $k$-dimensional Hawaiian earring is defined as

$$\mathbb{H}_k=\bigcup_{n\in \N}\left\{(x_0,x_1,\ldots,x_k)\in\R^{k+1} : \left(x_0-\frac 1  n \right)^2 + x_1^2 + \cdots+x_k^2=\frac{1}{n^2}\right\}.$$

Hence, $\mathbb{H}_k$ is a countable union of k-spheres which have one single point in common, and the topology is given by a metric in which the sphere's diameters converge to zero as $n\to\infty.$ Alternatively, $\mathbb{H}_k$ may be constructed as the Alexandrov compactification of a countable union of disjoint $\R^k$s. Recursively, one has that $\mathbb{H}_0$ consists of a convergent sequence, $\mathbb{H}_1$ is the original Hawaiian earring, and $\mathbb{H}_{k+1}$ is homeomorphic to the reduced suspension $\Sigma\mathbb{H}_{k}$.

For $k\geq 1$, the $k$-dimensional Hawaiian earring is a compact, $(k-1)$-connected and locally $(k-1)$-connected. For $k\geq 2$, it is known that $\pi_k(\mathbb{H}_k)$ is isomorphic to the Baer–Specker group $\prod_{i=1}^{\infty}\mathbb{Z}.$

For $q\equiv 1\bmod(k-1)$ and $q>1,$ Barratt and Milnor showed that the singular homology group $H_q(\mathbb{H}_k;\Q)$ is a nontrivial uncountable group for each such $q$.

== See also ==
- List of topologies
