= Well-chained space =

Metric space connected by chains

In mathematics, a well-chained space is a metric space in which two arbitrary points can be connected by a chain of points that are arbitrarily close. It is closely related to the notion of connectedness.

== Formal definition ==
A metric space $(X, d)$ is said to be well-chained if for every $x, y \in X$ and every $\varepsilon > 0$ there exists $n \in \mathbb{N}$ and $z_0, z_1, \dotsc, z_n \in X$ such that $z_0= x$, $z_n = y$ and for every $j \in \{1, \dotsc, n - 1\}$, one has $d (z_{j - 1}, z_j) < \varepsilon$.

A set $A \subseteq X$ is well-chained if it is well-chained as a metric space with the distance $d$ restricted to $A$.

== Properties ==
A set $A \subseteq X$ is well-chained if and only if its topological closure is well-chained.

If $X$ is well-chained and if $f \colon X \to Y$ is uniformly continuous then the set $f (X)$ is well-chained.

== Characterizations ==
The following properties are equivalent:

1. the space $X$ is well-chained;
2. if $A \subseteq X$ and $\emptyset \ne A \ne X$, then $\inf \{ d (x, y) : x \in A \text{ and } y \in X \setminus A\} = 0$;
3. if $f \colon X \to \{0, 1\}$ is uniformly continuous, then $f$ is constant.

== Link with connectedness ==
Well-chainedness is a generalization of connectedness, in the sense that any connected (metric) space $X$ is well-chained.

The converse fails in general:

- the set of rational numbers $\mathbb{Q}$ is well-chained but not connected,
- the set $\{(x, y) \in \mathbb{R}^2 : x^2 y^2 = xy\}$ is well-chained but not connected.

There are some situations where well-chainedness implies connectedness:

- every compact and well-chained set is connected;
- if $A \subseteq \mathbb{R}$ is closed and well-chained, then $A$ is connected.

== History ==
The definition of well-chained space was proposed as a definition of connected space (zusammenltiengende Punktmenge) by Georg Cantor in 1883.

In 1921, Maurice Fréchet names well-chained set (ensemble bien enchaîné) connected sets and proves, in the current terminology, that connected spaces are well-chained spaces.

The definition above appears in 1964 under the name of well-chained space in the book of Gordon Whyburn.
