= Approach space =

In topology, a branch of mathematics, approach spaces are a generalization of metric spaces, based on point-to-set distances, instead of point-to-point distances. They were introduced by Robert Lowen in 1989, in a series of papers on approach theory between 1988 and 1995.

== Definition ==
Given a metric space (X, d), or more generally, an extended pseudoquasimetric (which will be abbreviated ∞pq-metric here), one can define an induced map d: X × P(X) → [0,∞] by d(x, A) = inf{d(x, a) : a ∈ A}. With this example in mind, a distance on X is defined to be a map X × P(X) → [0,∞] satisfying for all x in X and A, B ⊆ X,

1. d(x, {x}) = 0,
2. d(x, Ø) = ∞,
3. d(x, A∪B) = min(d(x, A), d(x, B)),
4. For all 0 ≤ ε ≤ ∞, d(x, A) ≤ d(x, A^{(ε)}) + ε,

where we define A^{(ε)} = {x : d(x, A) ≤ ε}.

(The "empty infimum is positive infinity" convention is like the nullary intersection is everything convention.)

An approach space is defined to be a pair (X, d) where d is a distance function on X. Every approach space has a topology, given by treating A → A^{(0)} as a Kuratowski closure operator.

The appropriate maps between approach spaces are the contractions. A map f: (X, d) → (Y, e) is a contraction if e(f(x), f[A]) ≤ d(x, A) for all x ∈ X and A ⊆ X.

== Examples ==
Every ∞pq-metric space (X, d) can be distanced to (X, d), as described at the beginning of the definition.

Given a set X, the discrete distance is given by d(x, A) = 0 if x ∈ A and d(x, A) = ∞ if x ∉ A. The induced topology is the discrete topology.

Given a set X, the indiscrete distance is given by d(x, A) = 0 if A is non-empty, and d(x, A) = ∞ if A is empty. The induced topology is the indiscrete topology.

Given a topological space X, a topological distance is given by d(x, A) = 0 if x ∈ A̅, and d(x, A) = ∞ otherwise. The induced topology is the original topology. In fact, the only two-valued distances are the topological distances.

Let P = [0, ∞] be the extended non-negative reals. Let d^{+}(x, A) = max(x − sup A, 0) for x ∈ P and A ⊆ P. Given any approach space (X, d), the maps (for each A ⊆ X) d(., A) : (X, d) → (P, d^{+}) are contractions.

On P, let e(x, A) = inf{|x − a| : a ∈ A} for x < ∞, let e(∞, A) = 0 if A is unbounded, and let e(∞, A) = ∞ if A is bounded. Then (P, e) is an approach space. Topologically, P is the one-point compactification of [0, ∞). Note that e extends the ordinary Euclidean distance. This cannot be done with the ordinary Euclidean metric.

Let βN be the Stone–Čech compactification of the integers. A point U ∈ βN is an ultrafilter on N. A subset A ⊆ βN induces a filter F(A) = ∩ {U : U ∈ A}. Let b(U, A) = sup{ inf{ |n − j| : n ∈ X, j ∈ E } : X ∈ U, E ∈ F(A) }. Then (βN, b) is an approach space that extends the ordinary Euclidean distance on N. In contrast, βN is not metrizable.

== Equivalent definitions ==
Lowen has offered at least seven equivalent formulations. Two of them are below.

Let XPQ(X) denote the set of xpq-metrics on X. A subfamily G of XPQ(X) is called a gauge if

1. 0 ∈ G, where 0 is the zero metric, that is, 0(x, y) = 0 for all x, y,
2. e ≤ d ∈ G implies e ∈ G,
3. d, e ∈ G implies max(d,e) ∈ G (the "max" here is the pointwise maximum),
4. For all d ∈ XPQ(X), if for all x ∈ X, ε > 0, N < ∞ there is e ∈ G such that min(d(x,y), N) ≤ e(x, y) + ε for all y, then d ∈ G.

If G is a gauge on X, then d(x,A) = sup {e(x, a) } : e ∈ G} is a distance function on X. Conversely, given a distance function d on X, the set of e ∈ XPQ(X) such that e ≤ d is a gauge on X. The two operations are inverse to each other.

A contraction f: (X, d) → (Y, e) is, in terms of associated gauges G and H respectively, a map such that for all d ∈ H, d(f(.), f(.)) ∈ G.

A tower on X is a set of maps A → A^{[ε]} for A ⊆ X, ε ≥ 0, satisfying for all A, B ⊆ X and δ, ε ≥ 0

1. A ⊆ A^{[ε]},
2. Ø^{[ε]} = Ø,
3. (A ∪ B)^{[ε]} = A^{[ε]} ∪ B^{[ε]},
4. A^{[ε][δ]} ⊆ A^{[ε+δ]},
5. A^{[ε]} = ∩_{δ>ε} A^{[δ]}.

Given a distance d, the associated A → A^{(ε)} is a tower. Conversely, given a tower, the map d(x,A) = inf{ε : x ∈ A^{[ε]}} is a distance, and these two operations are inverses of each other.

A contraction f:(X, d)→(Y, e) is, in terms of associated towers, a map such that for all ε ≥ 0, f[A^{[ε]}] ⊆ f[A]^{[ε]}.

== Categorical properties ==
The main interest in approach spaces and their contractions is that they form a category with good properties, while still being quantitative like metric spaces. One can take arbitrary products, coproducts, and quotients, and the results appropriately generalize the corresponding results for topologies. One can even "distancize" such badly non-metrizable spaces like βN, the Stone–Čech compactification of the integers.

Certain hyperspaces, measure spaces, and probabilistic metric spaces turn out to be naturally endowed with a distance. Applications have also been made to approximation theory.
