= Semi-locally simply connected =

Property in algebraic topology

In mathematics, specifically algebraic topology, the semi-locally simply connected (or semilocally simply connected) property is a certain local connectedness condition that arises in the theory of covering spaces. Roughly speaking, a topological space X satisfies the property if for each point x in X any sufficiently small loop going through x can be contracted within X to a point. This condition is necessary for most of the theory of covering spaces, including the existence of a universal cover and the Galois correspondence between covering spaces and subgroups of the fundamental group.

Most “nice” spaces such as manifolds and CW complexes are semi-locally simply connected, and topological spaces that do not satisfy this condition are considered somewhat pathological. The standard example of a non-semi-locally simply connected space is the Hawaiian earring.

== Definition ==
A space X is called semi-locally simply connected if every point x in X has a neighborhood U with the property that every loop in U based at x can be contracted within X to the constant loop at x (i.e., every loop in U starting and ending at x is nullhomotopic in X via a basepoint-preserving homotopy).

Note that if U satisfies this condition, so does any smaller neighborhood of x, so that x has arbitrarily small neighborhoods satisfying the condition. The neighborhood U need not be simply connected: though every loop in U based at x must be contractible within X, the contraction is not required to take place inside of U. For this reason, a space can be semi-locally simply connected without being locally simply connected. Also, it is not required that every loop in U is nullhomotopic in X; it is only the loops in U based at x that must be nullhomotopic in X. In general, a semi-locally simply connected space may have points x with arbitrarily small neighborhoods containing loops (not going through x) that cannot be contracted to a point, even with homotopies in X.

An equivalent formulation of the definition is that every point in $x\in X$ has an open neighborhood $U$ for which the homomorphism $\pi_1(U,x)\to\pi_1(X,x)$ induced by the inclusion map of $U$ into $X$ is trivial. Here, $\pi_1(U,x)$ is the fundamental group of $U$ relative to the basepoint $x;$ and similarly for $\pi_1(X,x).$

Most of the main theorems about covering spaces, including the existence of a universal cover and the Galois correspondence, require a space to be path-connected, locally path-connected, and semi-locally simply connected, a condition known as unloopable (délaçable in French). In particular, this condition is necessary for a non-empty connected and locally path-connected space to have a non-empty simply connected covering space.

== Examples ==
The Hawaiian earring is not semi-locally simply connected.

A simple example of a space that is not semi-locally simply connected is the Hawaiian earring: the union of the circles in the Euclidean plane with centers (1/n, 0) and radii 1/n, for n a natural number. Give this space the subspace topology. Then all neighborhoods of the origin contain circles that are not nullhomotopic.

The Hawaiian earring can also be used to construct a semi-locally simply connected space that is not locally simply connected. In particular, the cone on the Hawaiian earring is contractible and therefore semi-locally simply connected, but it is clearly not locally simply connected.

== Topology of fundamental group ==
There are two natural topologies on the fundamental group $\pi_1(X,a)$.

One is the quotient topology of the topology on compact convergence on the space of loops (at the given base point $a$). This topology makes the group $\pi_1(X,a)$ a quasitopological group, meaning that the inverse map is continuous and the multiplication law is continuous in each argument. However, the multiplication law is not always continuous for this topology. This already fails for the Hawaiian earring.

The other topology is the admissible one. For this topology, the open subgroups correspond precisely to coverings, at least if the space is connected and locally pathwise connected.

For a connected and pathwise connected space, it is equivalent that it is délaçable, or that the quasitopological fundamental group is discrete, or that the admissible fundamental group is discrete.
