= Katsuya Eda =

Japanese mathematician

Katsuya Eda (江田 勝哉, Eda Katsuya) is a mathematician, currently a professor at Waseda University. His research centers on set theory and its applications, particularly in algebraic topology. He has done a great deal of work on the fundamental group of the Hawaiian earring and related subjects.
