= Resolvable space =

Concept in topology

In topology, a topological space is said to be resolvable if it is expressible as the union of two disjoint dense subsets. For instance, the real numbers form a resolvable topological space because the rationals and irrationals are disjoint dense subsets. A topological space that is not resolvable is termed irresolvable.

== Properties ==
- The product of two resolvable spaces is resolvable
- Every locally compact topological space without isolated points is resolvable
- Every submaximal space is irresolvable

== See also ==
- Glossary of topology
