= Core-compact space =

In general topology and related branches of mathematics, a core-compact topological space $X$ is a topological space whose partially ordered set of open subsets is a continuous poset. Equivalently, $X$ is core-compact if it is exponentiable in the category Top of topological spaces. This means that the functor $X\times - : \bf{Top} \to \bf{Top}$ has a right adjoint. Equivalently, for each topological space $Y$, there exists a topology on the set of continuous functions $\mathcal{C}(X,Y)$ such that function application $X \times \mathcal{C}(X, Y) \to Y$ is continuous, and each continuous map $X\times Z \to Y$ may be curried to a continuous map $Z \to \mathcal{C}(X,Y)$. Note that this is the Compact-open topology if (and only if) $X$ is locally compact. (In this article locally compact means that every point has a neighborhood base of compact neighborhoods; this is definition (3) in the linked article.)

Another equivalent concrete definition is that every open neighborhood $U$ of a point $x$ contains an open neighborhood $V$ of $x$ that is way-below $U$; $V$ is way-below (or relatively compact in) $U$ if and only if every open cover containing $U$ contains a finite subcover of $V$. As a result, every locally compact space is core-compact. For Hausdorff spaces (or more generally, sober spaces), core-compact space is equivalent to locally compact. In this sense the definition is a slight weakening of the definition of a locally compact space in the non-Hausdorff case.
