= Locally simply connected space =

In mathematics, a locally simply connected space is a topological space that admits a basis of simply connected sets.

The Hawaiian earring is not locally simply connected

The circle is an example of a locally simply connected space which is not simply connected. The Hawaiian earring is a space which is neither locally simply connected nor simply connected. The cone on the Hawaiian earring is contractible and therefore simply connected, but still not locally simply connected.

All topological manifolds and CW complexes are locally simply connected. In fact, these satisfy the much stronger property of being locally contractible.

A strictly weaker condition is that of being semi-locally simply connected. Both locally simply connected spaces and simply connected spaces are semi-locally simply connected, but neither converse holds.
