= Cosmic space =

In mathematics, particularly topology, a cosmic space is any topological space that is a continuous image of some separable metric space. Equivalently (for regular T_{1} spaces but not in general), a space is cosmic if and only if it has a countable network; namely a countable collection of subsets of the space such that any open set is the union of a subcollection of these sets.

Cosmic spaces have several interesting properties. There are a number of unsolved problems about them.

== Examples and properties ==
- Any open subset of a cosmic space is cosmic since open subsets of separable spaces are separable.
- Separable metric spaces are trivially cosmic.

== Unsolved problems ==
It is unknown as to whether X is cosmic if:

a) X^{2} contains no uncountable discrete space;

b) the countable product of X with itself is hereditarily separable and hereditarily Lindelöf.
