= Separated sets =

Type of relation for subsets of a topological space

Separation axioms in topological spaces

Kolmogorov classification
- T_{0}: Kolmogorov
- T_{1}: Fréchet
- T_{2}: Hausdorff
- T_{2½}: Urysohn
- completely T_{2}: completely Hausdorff
- T_{3}: regular Hausdorff
- T_{3½}: Tychonoff
- T_{4}: normal Hausdorff
- T_{5}: completely normal Hausdorff
- T_{6}: perfectly normal Hausdorff

In topology and related branches of mathematics, separated sets are pairs of subsets of a given topological space that are related to each other in a certain way: roughly speaking, neither overlapping nor touching. The notion of when two sets are separated or not is important both to the notion of connected spaces (and their connected components) as well as to the separation axioms for topological spaces.

Separated sets should not be confused with separated spaces (defined below), which are somewhat related but different. Separable spaces are again a completely different topological concept.

== Definitions ==
There are various ways in which two subsets $A$ and $B$ of a topological space $X$ can be considered to be separated. A most basic way in which two sets can be separated is if they are disjoint, that is, if their intersection is the empty set. This property has nothing to do with topology as such, but only set theory. Each of the following properties is stricter than disjointness, incorporating some topological information.

The properties below are presented in increasing order of specificity, each being a stronger notion than the preceding one.

The sets $A$ and $B$ are separated in $X$ if each is disjoint from the other's closure:

$$A \cap \bar{B} = \varnothing = \bar{A} \cap B.$$

This property is known as the Hausdorff−Lennes Separation Condition. Since every set is contained in its closure, two separated sets automatically must be disjoint. The closures themselves do not have to be disjoint from each other; for example, the intervals $[0, 1)$ and $(1, 2]$ are separated in the real line $\Reals,$ even though the point 1 belongs to both of their closures. A more general example is that in any metric space, two open balls $B_r(p) = \{x \in X : d(p, x) < r\}$ and $B_s(q) = \{x \in X : d(q, x) < s\}$ are separated whenever $d(p, q) \geq r + s.$ The property of being separated can also be expressed in terms of derived set (indicated by the prime symbol): $A$ and $B$ are separated when they are disjoint and each is disjoint from the other's derived set, that is, $A' \cap B = \varnothing = B' \cap A.$ (As in the case of the first version of the definition, the derived sets $A'$ and $B'$ are not required to be disjoint from each other.)

The sets $A$ and $B$ are separated by neighbourhoods if there are neighbourhoods $U$ of $A$ and $V$ of $B$ such that $U$ and $V$ are disjoint. (Sometimes $U$ and $V$ are required to be open neighbourhoods, but this makes no difference in the end.) For the example of $A = [0, 1)$ and $B = (1, 2],$ one could take $U = (-1, 1)$ and $V = (1, 3).$ If any two sets are separated by neighbourhoods, then certainly they are separated. If $A$ and $B$ are open and disjoint, then they must be separated by neighbourhoods; just take $U = A$ and $V = B.$ For this reason, separatedness is often used with closed sets (as in the normal separation axiom).

The sets $A$ and $B$ are separated by closed neighbourhoods if there is a closed neighbourhood $U$ of $A$ and a closed neighbourhood $V$ of $B$ such that $U$ and $V$ are disjoint. Our examples, $[0, 1)$ and $(1, 2],$ are not separated by closed neighbourhoods. Either $U$ or $V$ can be closed by including the point 1 in it, but they cannot both be closed and disjoint. If any two sets are separated by closed neighbourhoods, then certainly they are separated by neighbourhoods.

The sets $A$ and $B$ are separated by a continuous function (or completely separated) if there exists a continuous function $f : X \to \Reals$ from the space $X$ to the real line $\Reals$ such that $A \subseteq f^{-1}(0)$ and $B \subseteq f^{-1}(1),$ that is, members of $A$ map to 0 and members of $B$ map to 1. (Sometimes the unit interval $[0, 1]$ is used in place of $\Reals$ in this definition, but this makes no difference.) In our example, $[0, 1)$ and $(1, 2]$ are not separated by a function, because there is no way to continuously define $f$ at the point 1. If two sets are separated by a continuous function, then they are also separated by closed neighbourhoods; the neighbourhoods can be given in terms of the preimage of $f$ as $U = f^{-1}[-c, c]$ and $V = f^{-1}[1 - c, 1 + c],$ where $c$ is any positive real number less than $1/2.$

The sets $A$ and $B$ are precisely separated by a continuous function if there exists a continuous function $f : X \to \Reals$ such that $A = f^{-1}(0)$ and $B = f^{-1}(1).$ (Again, the $\Reals$ can be replaced with the unit interval, but it makes no difference.) If any two sets are precisely separated by a function, then they are separated by a function. Since $\{0\}$ and $\{1\}$ are closed in $\Reals,$ only closed sets are capable of being precisely separated by a function, but just because two sets are closed and separated by a function does not mean that they are automatically precisely separated by a function (even a different function).

== Relation to separation axioms and separated spaces ==
The separation axioms are various conditions that are sometimes imposed upon topological spaces, many of which can be described in terms of the various types of separated sets. As an example we will define the T_{2} axiom, which is the condition imposed on separated spaces. Specifically, a topological space is separated if, given any two distinct points x and y, the singleton sets {x} and {y} are separated by neighbourhoods.

Separated spaces are usually called Hausdorff spaces or T_{2} spaces.

== Relation to connected spaces ==
Given a topological space X, it is sometimes useful to consider whether it is possible for a subset A to be separated from its complement. This is certainly true if A is either the empty set or the entire space X, but there may be other possibilities. A topological space X is connected if these are the only two possibilities. Conversely, if a nonempty subset A is separated from its own complement, and if the only subset of A to share this property is the empty set, then A is an open-connected component of X. (In the degenerate case where X is itself the empty set $\emptyset,$ authorities differ on whether $\emptyset$ is connected and whether $\emptyset$ is an open-connected component of itself.)

== Relation to topologically distinguishable points ==
Given a topological space X, two points x and y are topologically distinguishable if there exists an open set that one point belongs to but the other point does not. If x and y are topologically distinguishable, then the singleton sets {x} and {y} must be disjoint. On the other hand, if the singletons {x} and {y} are separated, then the points x and y must be topologically distinguishable. Thus for singletons, topological distinguishability is a condition in between disjointness and separatedness.

== See also ==
- Hausdorff space – Type of topological space
- Locally Hausdorff space – Space such that every point has a Hausdorff neighborhood
- Separation axiom – Axioms in topology defining notions of "separation"
