= Path (topology) =

Continuous function whose domain is a closed unit interval

The points traced by a path from $A$ to $B$ in $\mathbb{R}^2.$ However, different paths can trace the same set of points.

In mathematics, a path in a topological space $X$ is a continuous function from a closed interval into $X.$

Paths play an important role in the fields of topology and mathematical analysis. For example, a topological space for which there exists a path connecting any two points is said to be path-connected. Any space may be broken up into path-connected components. The set of path-connected components of a space $X$ is often denoted $\pi_0(X).$

One can also define paths and loops in pointed spaces, which are important in homotopy theory. If $X$ is a topological space with basepoint $x_0,$ then a path in $X$ is one whose initial point is $x_0$. Likewise, a loop in $X$ is one that is based at $x_0$.

== Definition ==
A curve in a topological space $X$ is a continuous function $f : J \to X$ from a non-empty and non-degenerate interval $J \subseteq \R.$ A path in $X$ is a curve $f : [a, b] \to X$ whose domain $[a, b]$ is a compact non-degenerate interval (meaning $a < b$ are real numbers), where $f(a)$ is called the initial point of the path and $f(b)$ is called its terminal point. A path from $x$ to $y$ is a path whose initial point is $x$ and whose terminal point is $y.$ Every non-degenerate compact interval $[a, b]$ is homeomorphic to $[0, 1],$ which is why a path is sometimes, especially in homotopy theory, defined to be a continuous function $f : [0, 1] \to X$ from the closed unit interval $I := [0, 1]$ into $X.$

An arc or C^{0}-arc in $X$ is a path in $X$ that is also a topological embedding.

Importantly, a path is not just a subset of $X$ that "looks like" a curve, it also includes a parameterization. For example, the maps $f(x) = x$ and $g(x) = x^2$ represent two different paths from 0 to 1 on the real line.

A loop in a space $X$ based at $x \in X$ is a path from $x$ to $x.$ A loop may be equally well regarded as a map $f : [0, 1] \to X$ with $f(0) = f(1)$ or as a continuous map from the unit circle $S^1$ to $X$

$$f : S^1 \to X.$$

This is because $S^1$ is the quotient space of $I = [0, 1]$ when $0$ is identified with $1.$ The set of all loops in $X$ forms a space called the loop space of $X.$

== Homotopy of paths ==
A homotopy between two paths.

Paths and loops are central subjects of study in the branch of algebraic topology called homotopy theory. A homotopy of paths makes precise the notion of continuously deforming a path while keeping its endpoints fixed.

Specifically, a homotopy of paths, or path-homotopy, in $X$ is a family of paths $f_t : [0, 1] \to X$ indexed by $I = [0, 1]$ such that

- $f_t(0) = x_0$ and $f_t(1) = x_1$ are fixed.
- the map $F : [0, 1] \times [0, 1] \to X$ given by $F(s, t) = f_t(s)$ is continuous.

The paths $f_0$ and $f_1$ connected by a homotopy are said to be homotopic (or more precisely path-homotopic, to distinguish between the relation defined on all continuous functions between fixed spaces). One can likewise define a homotopy of loops keeping the base point fixed.

The relation of being homotopic is an equivalence relation on paths in a topological space. The equivalence class of a path $f$ under this relation is called the homotopy class of $f,$ often denoted $[f].$

== Path composition ==
One can compose paths in a topological space in the following manner. Suppose $f$ is a path from $x$ to $y$ and $g$ is a path from $y$ to $z$. The path $fg$ is defined as the path obtained by first traversing $f$ and then traversing $g$:

$$fg(s) = \begin{cases}f(2s) & 0 \leq s \leq \frac{1}{2} \\ g(2s-1) & \frac{1}{2} \leq s \leq 1.\end{cases}$$

Clearly path composition is only defined when the terminal point of $f$ coincides with the initial point of $g.$ If one considers all loops based at a point $x_0,$ then path composition is a binary operation.

Path composition, whenever defined, is not associative due to the difference in parametrization. However it is associative up to path-homotopy. That is, $[(fg)h] = [f(gh)].$ Path composition defines a group structure on the set of homotopy classes of loops based at a point $x_0$ in $X.$ The resultant group is called the fundamental group of $X$ based at $x_0,$ usually denoted $\pi_1\left(X, x_0\right).$

In situations calling for associativity of path composition "on the nose," a path in $X$ may instead be defined as a continuous map from an interval $[0, a]$ to $X$ for any real $a \geq 0.$ (Such a path is called a Moore path.) A path $f$ of this kind has a length $|f|$ defined as $a.$ Path composition is then defined as before with the following modification:

$$fg(s) = \begin{cases}f(s) & 0 \leq s \leq |f| \\ g(s-|f|) & |f| \leq s \leq |f| + |g|\end{cases}$$

Whereas with the previous definition, $f,$ $g$, and $fg$ all have length $1$ (the length of the domain of the map), this definition makes $|fg| = |f| + |g|.$ What made associativity fail for the previous definition is that although $(fg)h$ and $f(gh)$have the same length, namely $1,$ the midpoint of $(fg)h$ occurred between $g$ and $h,$ whereas the midpoint of $f(gh)$ occurred between $f$ and $g$. With this modified definition $(fg)h$ and $f(gh)$ have the same length, namely $|f| + |g| + |h|,$ and the same midpoint, found at $\left(|f| + |g| + |h|\right)/2$ in both $(fg)h$ and $f(gh)$; more generally they have the same parametrization throughout.

== Fundamental groupoid ==
There is a categorical picture of paths which is sometimes useful. Any topological space $X$ gives rise to a category where the objects are the points of $X$ and the morphisms are the homotopy classes of paths. Since any morphism in this category is an isomorphism, this category is a groupoid called the fundamental groupoid of $X.$ Loops in this category are the endomorphisms (all of which are actually automorphisms). The automorphism group of a point $x_0$ in $X$ is just the fundamental group based at $x_0$. More generally, one can define the fundamental groupoid on any subset $A$ of $X,$ using homotopy classes of paths joining points of $A.$ This is convenient for Van Kampen's Theorem.

== See also ==
- Curve § Topology
- Locally path-connected space – Property of topological spaces
- Path space (disambiguation)
- Path-connected space – Topological space that is connected
