= List of topologies =

List of concrete topologies and topological spaces

The following is a list of named topologies or topological spaces, many of which are counterexamples in topology and related branches of mathematics. This is not a list of properties that a topology or topological space might possess; for that, see List of general topology topics and Topological property.

== Discrete and indiscrete ==
- Discrete topology − All subsets are open.
- Indiscrete topology, chaotic topology, or Trivial topology − Only the empty set and its complement are open.

== Cardinality and ordinals ==
- Cocountable topology
  - Given a topological space $(X, \tau),$ the cocountable extension topology on $X$ is the topology having as a subbasis the union of τ and the family of all subsets of $X$ whose complements in $X$ are countable.
- Cofinite topology
- Double-pointed cofinite topology
- Ordinal number topology
- Pseudo-arc
- Ran space
- Tychonoff plank

=== Finite spaces ===
- Discrete two-point space − The simplest example of a totally disconnected discrete space.
- Finite topological space
- Pseudocircle − A finite topological space on 4 elements that fails to satisfy any separation axiom besides T_{0}. However, from the viewpoint of algebraic topology, it has the remarkable property that it is indistinguishable from the circle $S^1.$
- Sierpiński space, also called the connected two-point set − A 2-point set $\{0, 1\}$ with the particular point topology $\{\varnothing, \{1\}, \{0,1\}\}.$

== Integers ==
- Arens–Fort space − A Hausdorff, regular, normal space that is not first-countable or compact. It has an element (i.e. $p := (0, 0)$) for which there is no sequence in $X \setminus \{p\}$ that converges to $p$ but there is a sequence $x_\bull = \left(x_i\right)_{i=1}^\infty$ in $X \setminus \{(0, 0)\}$ such that $(0, 0)$ is a cluster point of $x_\bull.$
- Arithmetic progression topologies
- The Baire space − $\N^{\N}$ with the product topology, where $\N$ denotes the natural numbers endowed with the discrete topology. It is the space of all sequences of natural numbers.
- Divisor topology
- Partition topology
  - Deleted integer topology
  - Odd–even topology

== Fractals and Cantor set ==
- Apollonian gasket
- Cantor set − A subset of the closed interval $[0, 1]$ with remarkable properties.
  - Cantor dust
  - Cantor space
- Koch snowflake
- Menger sponge
- Mosely snowflake
- Sierpiński carpet
- Sierpiński triangle
- Smith–Volterra–Cantor set, also called the fat Cantor set − A closed nowhere dense (and thus meagre) subset of the unit interval $[0, 1]$ that has positive Lebesgue measure and is not a Jordan measurable set. The complement of the fat Cantor set in Jordan measure is a bounded open set that is not Jordan measurable.

== Orders ==
- Alexandrov topology
- Lexicographic order topology on the unit square
- Order topology
  - Lawson topology
  - Poset topology
  - Upper topology
  - Scott topology
    - Scott continuity
- Priestley space
- Roy's lattice space
- Split interval, also called the Alexandrov double arrow space and the two arrows space − All compact separable ordered spaces are order-isomorphic to a subset of the split interval. It is compact Hausdorff, hereditarily Lindelöf, and hereditarily separable but not metrizable. Its metrizable subspaces are all countable.
- Specialization (pre)order

== Manifolds and complexes ==
- Branching line − A non-Hausdorff manifold.
- Double origin topology
- E_{8} manifold − A topological manifold that does not admit a smooth structure.
- Euclidean topology − The natural topology on Euclidean space $\Reals^n$ induced by the Euclidean metric, which is itself induced by the Euclidean norm.
  - Real line − $\Reals$
  - Unit interval − $[0, 1]$
- Extended real number line
- Fake 4-ball − A compact contractible topological 4-manifold.
- House with two rooms − A contractible, 2-dimensional simplicial complex that is not collapsible.
- Klein bottle
- Lens space
- Line with two origins, also called the bug-eyed line − It is a non-Hausdorff manifold. It is locally homeomorphic to Euclidean space and thus locally metrizable (but not metrizable) and locally Hausdorff (but not Hausdorff). It is also a T_{1} locally regular space but not a semiregular space.
- Prüfer manifold − A Hausdorff 2-dimensional real analytic manifold that is not paracompact.
- Real projective line
- Torus
  - 3-torus
  - Solid torus
- Unknot
- Whitehead manifold − An open 3-manifold that is contractible, but not homeomorphic to $\Reals^3.$

=== Hyperbolic geometry ===
- Gieseking manifold − A cusped hyperbolic 3-manifold of finite volume.
- Horosphere
  - Horocycle
- Picard horn
- Seifert–Weber space

=== Paradoxical spaces ===
- Lakes of Wada − Three disjoint connected open sets of $\Reals^2$ or $(0, 1)^2$ that all have the same boundary.

=== Unique ===
- Hantzsche–Wendt manifold − A compact, orientable, flat 3-manifold. It is the only closed flat 3-manifold with first Betti number zero.

=== Related or similar to manifolds ===
- Dogbone space
- Dunce hat (topology)
- Hawaiian earring
- Long line (topology)
- Rose (topology)

== Embeddings and maps between spaces ==
- Alexander horned sphere − A particular embedding of a sphere into 3-dimensional Euclidean space.
- Antoine's necklace − A topological embedding of the Cantor set in 3-dimensional Euclidean space, whose complement is not simply connected.
- Irrational winding of a torus/Irrational cable on a torus
- Knot (mathematics)
- Linear flow on the torus
- Space-filling curve
- Torus knot
- Wild knot

== Counter-examples (general topology) ==
The following topologies are a known source of counterexamples for point-set topology.

- Alexandroff plank
- Appert topology − A Hausdorff, perfectly normal (T_{6}), zero-dimensional space that is countable, but neither first countable, locally compact, nor countably compact.
- Arens square
- Bullet-riddled square - The space $[0, 1]^2 \setminus \Q^2,$ where $[0, 1]^2 \cap \Q^2$ is the set of bullets. Neither of these sets is Jordan measurable although both are Lebesgue measurable.
- Cantor tree
- Comb space
- Dieudonné plank
- Double origin topology
- Dunce hat (topology)
- Either–or topology
- Excluded point topology − A topological space where the open sets are defined in terms of the exclusion of a particular point.
- Fort space
- Half-disk topology
- Hilbert cube − $[0, 1/1] \times [0, 1/2] \times [0, 1/3] \times \cdots$ with the product topology.
- Infinite broom
- Integer broom topology
- K-topology
- Knaster–Kuratowski fan
- Long line (topology)
- Moore plane, also called the Niemytzki plane − A first countable, separable, completely regular, Hausdorff, Moore space that is not normal, Lindelöf, metrizable, second countable, nor locally compact. It also an uncountable closed subspace with the discrete topology.
- Nested interval topology
- Overlapping interval topology − Second countable space that is T_{0} but not T_{1}.
- Particular point topology − Assuming the set is infinite, then contains a non-closed compact subset whose closure is not compact and moreover, it is neither metacompact nor paracompact.
- Rational sequence topology
- Sorgenfrey line, which is $\Reals$ endowed with lower limit topology − It is Hausdorff, perfectly normal, first-countable, separable, paracompact, Lindelöf, Baire, and a Moore space but not metrizable, second-countable, σ-compact, nor locally compact.
- Sorgenfrey plane, which is the product of two copies of the Sorgenfrey line − A Moore space that is neither normal, paracompact, nor second countable.
- Topologist's sine curve
- Tychonoff plank
- Vague topology
- Warsaw circle

== Topologies defined in terms of other topologies ==
=== Natural topologies ===
List of natural topologies.

- Adjunction space
- Disjoint union (topology)
- Extension topology
- Initial topology
- Final topology
- Product topology
- Quotient topology
- Subspace topology
- Weak topology

=== Compactifications ===
Compactifications include:

- Alexandroff extension
  - Projectively extended real line
- Bohr compactification
- Eells–Kuiper manifold
- Projectively extended real line
- Stone–Čech compactification
  - Stone topology
  - Stone–Čech remainder
- Wallman compactification

=== Topologies of uniform convergence ===
This lists named topologies of uniform convergence.

- Compact-open topology
  - Loop space
- Interlocking interval topology
- Modes of convergence (annotated index)
- Operator topologies
- Pointwise convergence
  - Weak convergence (Hilbert space)
  - Weak* topology
- Polar topology
- Strong dual topology
- Topologies on spaces of linear maps

=== Other induced topologies ===
- Box topology
- Compact complement topology
- Duplication of a point: Let $x \in X$ be a non-isolated point of $X,$ let $d \not\in X$ be arbitrary, and let $Y = X \cup \{d\}.$ Then $\tau = \{V \subseteq Y : \text{ either } V \text{ or } ( V \setminus \{d\}) \cup \{x\} \text{ is an open subset of } X\}$ is a topology on $Y$ and $x$ and $d$ have the same neighborhood filters in $Y.$ In this way, $x$ has been duplicated.
- Extension topology

== Functional analysis ==
- Auxiliary normed spaces
- Finest locally convex topology
- Finest vector topology
- Helly space
- Mackey topology
- Polar topology
- Vague topology

=== Operator topologies ===
- Dual topology
- Norm topology
- Operator topologies
- Pointwise convergence
  - Weak convergence (Hilbert space)
  - Weak* topology
- Polar topology
- Strong dual space
- Strong operator topology
- Topologies on spaces of linear maps
- Ultrastrong topology
- Ultraweak topology/weak-* operator topology
- Weak operator topology

=== Tensor products ===
- Inductive tensor product
- Injective tensor product
- Projective tensor product
- Tensor product of Hilbert spaces
- Topological tensor product

== Probability ==
- Émery topology

== Other topologies ==
- Erdős space − A Hausdorff, totally disconnected, one-dimensional topological space $X$ that is homeomorphic to $X \times X.$
- Half-disk topology
- Hedgehog space
- Partition topology
- Zariski topology

== See also ==
- Counterexamples in Topology – Book by Lynn Steen
- List of Banach spaces
- List of fractals by Hausdorff dimension
- List of manifolds
- List of topologies on the category of schemes
- List of topology topics
- Lists of mathematics topics
- Natural topology – Notion in topology
- Table of Lie groups – Lie groups and their associated Lie algebras
