= List of examples in general topology =

This is a list of useful examples in general topology, a field of mathematics.

- Alexandrov topology
- Cantor space
- Co-kappa topology
  - Cocountable topology
  - Cofinite topology
- Compact-open topology
- Compactification
- Discrete topology
- Double-pointed cofinite topology
- Extended real number line
- Finite topological space
- Hawaiian earring
- Hilbert cube
- Irrational cable on a torus
- Lakes of Wada
- Long line
- Order topology
  - Lexicographical/dictionary order
  - Ordinal number topology
  - Real line
  - Split interval
- Overlapping interval topology
- Moore plane
- Sierpiński space
- Sorgenfrey line
- Sorgenfrey plane
- Space-filling curve
- Topologist's sine curve
- Trivial topology
- Unit interval
- Zariski topology

== See also ==
- Counterexamples in Topology
- π-Base: An Interactive Encyclopedia of Topological Spaces
