= Appert topology =

Example of a topology on the set of positive integers

In general topology, a branch of mathematics, the Appert topology, named for Antoine Appert (1934), is a topology on the set X = {1, 2, 3, ...} of positive integers. In the Appert topology, the open sets are those that do not contain 1, and those that asymptotically contain almost every positive integer. The space X with the Appert topology is called the Appert space.

== Construction ==
For a subset S of X, let N(n,S) denote the number of elements of S which are less than or equal to n:
$$\mathrm{N}(n,S) = \#\{ m \in S : m \le n \} .$$

S is defined to be open in the Appert topology if either it does not contain 1 or if it has asymptotic density equal to 1, i.e., it satisfies
$$\lim_{n \to \infty} \frac{\text{N}(n,S)}{n} = 1.$$

The empty set is open because it does not contain 1, and the whole set X is open since $\text{N}(n,X)/n=1$ for all n.

== Related topologies ==
The Appert topology is closely related to the Fort space topology that arises from giving the set of integers greater than one the discrete topology, and then taking the point 1 as the point at infinity in a one point compactification of the space. The Appert topology is finer than the Fort space topology, as any cofinite subset of X has asymptotic density equal to 1.

== Properties ==
- The closed subsets S of X are those that either contain 1 or that have zero asymptotic density, namely $\lim_{n\to\infty} \mathrm{N}(n,S)/n = 0$.
- Every point of X has a local basis of clopen sets, i.e., X is a zero-dimensional space.
  Proof: Every open neighborhood of 1 is also closed. For any $x\ne 1$, $\{x\}$ is both closed and open.
- X is Hausdorff and perfectly normal (T_{6}).
  Proof: X is T_{1}. Given any two disjoint closed sets A and B, at least one of them, say A, does not contain 1. A is then clopen and A and its complement are disjoint respective neighborhoods of A and B, which shows that X is normal and Hausdorff. Finally, any subset, in particular any closed subset, in a countable T_{1} space is a G_{δ}, so X is perfectly normal.
- X is countable, but not first countable, and hence not second countable and not metrizable.
- A subset of X is compact if and only if it is finite. In particular, X is not locally compact, since there is no compact neighborhood of 1.
- X is not countably compact.
  Proof: The infinite set $\{2^n:n\ge 1\}$ has zero asymptotic density, hence is closed in X. Each of its points is isolated. Since X contains an infinite closed discrete subset, it is not limit point compact, and therefore it is not countably compact.

== See also ==
- List of topologies – List of concrete topologies and topological spaces
