= Split interval =

In topology, the split interval, or double arrow space, is a topological space that results from splitting each point in a closed interval into two adjacent points and giving the resulting ordered set the order topology. It satisfies various interesting properties and serves as a useful counterexample in general topology.

== Definition ==
The split interval can be defined as the lexicographic product $[0, 1] \times\{0, 1\}$ equipped with the order topology. Equivalently, the space can be constructed by taking the closed interval $[0,1]$ with its usual order, splitting each point $a$ into two adjacent points $a^-<a^+$, and giving the resulting linearly ordered set the order topology. The space is also known as the double arrow space, Alexandrov double arrow space or two arrows space.

The space above is a linearly ordered topological space with two isolated points, $(0,0)$ and $(1,1)$ in the lexicographic product. Some authors take as definition the same space without the two isolated points. (In the point splitting description this corresponds to not splitting the endpoints $0$ and $1$ of the interval.) The resulting space has essentially the same properties.

The double arrow space is a subspace of the lexicographically ordered unit square. If we ignore the isolated points, a base for the double arrow space topology consists of all sets of the form $((a,b]\times\{0\}) \cup ([a,b)\times\{1\})$ with $a<b$. (In the point splitting description these are the clopen intervals of the form $[a^+,b^-]=(a^-,b^+)$, which are simultaneously closed intervals and open intervals.) The lower subspace $(0,1]\times\{0\}$ is homeomorphic to the Sorgenfrey line with half-open intervals to the left as a base for the topology, and the upper subspace $[0,1)\times\{1\}$ is homeomorphic to the Sorgenfrey line with half-open intervals to the right as a base, like two parallel arrows going in opposite directions, hence the name.

== Properties ==
The split interval $X$ is a zero-dimensional compact Hausdorff space. It is a linearly ordered topological space that is separable but not second countable, hence not metrizable; its metrizable subspaces are all countable.

It is hereditarily Lindelöf, hereditarily separable, and perfectly normal (T_{6}). But the product $X\times X$ of the space with itself is not even hereditarily normal (T_{5}), as it contains a copy of the Sorgenfrey plane, which is not normal.

All compact, separable ordered spaces are order-isomorphic to a subset of the split interval.

== See also ==
- List of topologies – List of concrete topologies and topological spaces
