= Half-disk topology =

In mathematics, and particularly general topology, the half-disk topology is an example of a topology given to the set $X$, given by all points $(x,y)$ in the plane such that $y\ge 0$. The set $X$ can be termed the closed upper half plane.

== Construction ==
We consider $X$ to consist of the open upper half plane $P$, given by all points $(x,y)$ in the plane such that $y>0$; and the x-axis $L$, given by all points $(x,y)$ in the plane such that $y=0$. Clearly $X$ is given by the union $P\cup L$. The open upper half plane $P$ has a topology given by the Euclidean metric topology. We extend the topology on $P$ to a topology on $X=P\cup L$ by adding some additional open sets. These extra sets are of the form ${(x,0)}\cup (P\cap U)$, where $(x,0)$ is a point on the line $L$ and $U$ is a neighbourhood of $(x,0)$ in the plane, open with respect to the Euclidean metric (defining the disk radius).

== Properties of $X$ ==
This topology results in a space satisfying the following properties.

- $X$ is Hausdorff (and thus also $T_0$ and $T_1$).
- $X$ is not regular and therefore not normal.
- $L$ with the subspace topology of $X$ is discrete, so $X$ is not second-countable.
- $X$ is separable. A countably dense subset is given by the rational points $X\cap\mathbb{Q}$.

== See also ==
- List of topologies
