= General topology =

Branch of topology

The Topologist's sine curve, a useful example in point-set topology. It is connected but not path-connected.

In mathematics, general topology (or point set topology) is the branch of topology that deals with the basic set-theoretic definitions and constructions used in topology. It is the foundation of most other branches of topology, including differential topology, geometric topology, and algebraic topology.

The fundamental concepts in point-set topology are continuity, compactness, and connectedness:

- Continuous functions, intuitively, take nearby points to nearby points.
- Compact sets are those that can be covered by finitely many sets of arbitrarily small size.
- Connected sets are sets that cannot be divided into two pieces that are far apart.

The terms 'nearby', 'arbitrarily small', and 'far apart' can all be made precise by using the concept of open sets. If we change the definition of 'open set', we change what continuous functions, compact sets, and connected sets are. Each choice of definition for 'open set' is called a topology. A set with a topology is called a topological space.

Metric spaces are an important class of topological spaces where a real, non-negative distance, also called a metric, can be defined on pairs of points in the set. Having a metric simplifies many proofs, and many of the most common topological spaces are metric spaces.

== History ==
General topology grew out of a number of areas, most importantly the following:

- the detailed study of subsets of the real line (once known as the topology of point sets; this usage is now obsolete)
- the introduction of the manifold concept
- the study of metric spaces, especially normed linear spaces, in the early days of functional analysis.

General topology assumed its present form around 1940. It captures, one might say, almost everything in the intuition of continuity, in a technically adequate form that can be applied in any area of mathematics.

== A topology on a set ==
Let X be a set and let τ be a family of subsets of X. Then τ is called a topology on X if:

1. Both the empty set and X are elements of τ
2. Any union of elements of τ is an element of τ
3. Any intersection of finitely many elements of τ is an element of τ

If τ is a topology on X, then the pair (X, τ) is called a topological space. The notation X_{τ} may be used to denote a set X endowed with the particular topology τ.

The members of τ are called open sets in X. A subset of X is said to be closed if its complement is in τ (i.e., its complement is open). A subset of X may be open, closed, both (clopen set), or neither. The empty set and X itself are always both closed and open.

=== Basis for a topology ===
A base (or basis) B for a topological space X with topology T is a collection of open sets in T such that every open set in T can be written as a union of elements of B. We say that the base generates the topology T. Bases are useful because many properties of topologies can be reduced to statements about a base that generates that topology—and because many topologies are most easily defined in terms of a base that generates them.

=== Subspace and quotient ===
Every subset of a topological space can be given the subspace topology in which the open sets are the intersections of the open sets of the larger space with the subset. For any indexed family of topological spaces, the product can be given the product topology, which is generated by the inverse images of open sets of the factors under the projection mappings. For example, in finite products, a basis for the product topology consists of all products of open sets. For infinite products, there is the additional requirement that in a basic open set, all but finitely many of its projections are the entire space.

A quotient space is defined as follows: if X is a topological space and Y is a set, and if f : X→ Y is a surjective function, then the quotient topology on Y is the collection of subsets of Y that have open inverse images under f. In other words, the quotient topology is the finest topology on Y for which f is continuous. A common example of a quotient topology is when an equivalence relation is defined on the topological space X. The map f is then the natural projection onto the set of equivalence classes.

=== Examples of topological spaces ===
A given set may have many different topologies. If a set is given a different topology, it is viewed as a different topological space.

==== Discrete and trivial topologies ====
Any set can be given the discrete topology, in which every subset is open. The only convergent sequences or nets in this topology are those that are eventually constant. Also, any set can be given the trivial topology (also called the indiscrete topology), in which only the empty set and the whole space are open. Every sequence and net in this topology converges to every point of the space. This example shows that in general topological spaces, limits of sequences need not be unique. However, often topological spaces must be Hausdorff spaces where limit points are unique.

==== Cofinite and cocountable topologies ====
Any set can be given the cofinite topology in which the open sets are the empty set and the sets whose complement is finite. This is the smallest T_{1} topology on any infinite set.

Any set can be given the cocountable topology, in which a set is defined as open if it is either empty or its complement is countable. When the set is uncountable, this topology serves as a counterexample in many situations.

==== Topologies on the real and complex numbers ====
There are many ways to define a topology on R, the set of real numbers. The standard topology on R is generated by the open intervals. The set of all open intervals forms a base or basis for the topology, meaning that every open set is a union of some collection of sets from the base. In particular, this means that a set is open if there exists an open interval of non zero radius about every point in the set. More generally, the Euclidean spaces R^{n} can be given a topology. In the usual topology on R^{n} the basic open sets are the open balls. Similarly, C, the set of complex numbers, and C^{n} have a standard topology in which the basic open sets are open balls.

The real line can also be given the lower limit topology. Here, the basic open sets are the half open intervals [a, b). This topology on R is strictly finer than the Euclidean topology defined above; a sequence converges to a point in this topology if and only if it converges from above in the Euclidean topology. This example shows that a set may have many distinct topologies defined on it.

==== The metric topology ====
Every metric space can be given a metric topology, in which the basic open sets are open balls defined by the metric. This is the standard topology on any normed vector space. On a finite-dimensional vector space this topology is the same for all norms.

==== Further examples ====
- There exist numerous topologies on any given finite set. Such spaces are called finite topological spaces. Finite spaces are sometimes used to provide examples or counterexamples to conjectures about topological spaces in general.
- Every manifold has a natural topology, since it is locally Euclidean. Similarly, every simplex and every simplicial complex inherits a natural topology from R^{n}.
- The Zariski topology is defined algebraically on the spectrum of a ring or an algebraic variety. On R^{n} or C^{n}, the closed sets of the Zariski topology are the solution sets of systems of polynomial equations.
- A linear graph has a natural topology that generalises many of the geometric aspects of graphs with vertices and edges.
- Many sets of linear operators in functional analysis are endowed with topologies that are defined by specifying when a particular sequence of functions converges to the zero function.
- Any local field has a topology native to it, and this can be extended to vector spaces over that field.
- The Sierpiński space is the simplest non-discrete topological space. It has important relations to the theory of computation and semantics.
- If Γ is an ordinal number, then the set Γ = [0, Γ) may be endowed with the order topology generated by the intervals (a, b), [0, b) and (a, Γ) where a and b are elements of Γ.

== Continuous functions ==
Continuity is expressed in terms of neighborhoods: f is continuous at some point x ∈ X if and only if for any neighborhood V of f(x), there is a neighborhood U of x such that f(U) ⊆ V. Intuitively, continuity means no matter how "small" V becomes, there is always a U containing x that maps inside V and whose image under f contains f(x). This is equivalent to the condition that the preimages of the open (closed) sets in Y are open (closed) in X. In metric spaces, this definition is equivalent to the ε–δ-definition that is often used in analysis.

An extreme example: if a set X is given the discrete topology, all functions
$$f\colon X \rightarrow T$$
to any topological space T are continuous. On the other hand, if X is equipped with the indiscrete topology and the space T set is at least T_{0}, then the only continuous functions are the constant functions. Conversely, any function whose range is indiscrete is continuous.

=== Alternative definitions ===
Several equivalent definitions for a topological structure exist and thus there are several equivalent ways to define a continuous function.

==== Neighborhood definition ====
Definitions based on preimages are often difficult to use directly. The following criterion expresses continuity in terms of neighborhoods: f is continuous at some point x ∈ X if and only if for any neighborhood V of f(x), there is a neighborhood U of x such that f(U) ⊆ V. Intuitively, continuity means no matter how "small" V becomes, there is always a U containing x that maps inside V.

If X and Y are metric spaces, it is equivalent to consider the neighborhood system of open balls centered at x and f(x) instead of all neighborhoods. This gives back the above δ-ε definition of continuity in the context of metric spaces. However, in general topological spaces, there is no notion of nearness or distance.

Note, however, that if the target space is Hausdorff, it is still true that f is continuous at a if and only if the limit of f as x approaches a is f(a). At an isolated point, every function is continuous.

==== Sequences and nets ====
In several contexts, the topology of a space is conveniently specified in terms of limit points. In many instances, this is accomplished by specifying when a point is the limit of a sequence, but for some spaces that are too large in some sense, one specifies also when a point is the limit of more general sets of points indexed by a directed set, known as nets. A function is continuous only if it takes limits of sequences to limits of sequences. In the former case, preservation of limits is also sufficient; in the latter, a function may preserve all limits of sequences yet still fail to be continuous, and preservation of nets is a necessary and sufficient condition.

In detail, a function f: X → Y is sequentially continuous if whenever a sequence (x_{n}) in X converges to a limit x, the sequence (f(x_{n})) converges to f(x). Thus sequentially continuous functions "preserve sequential limits". Every continuous function is sequentially continuous. If X is a first-countable space and countable choice holds, then the converse also holds: any function preserving sequential limits is continuous. In particular, if X is a metric space, sequential continuity and continuity are equivalent. For non first-countable spaces, sequential continuity might be strictly weaker than continuity. (The spaces for which the two properties are equivalent are called sequential spaces.) This motivates the consideration of nets instead of sequences in general topological spaces. Continuous functions preserve limits of nets, and in fact this property characterizes continuous functions.

==== Closure operator definition ====
Instead of specifying the open subsets of a topological space, the topology can also be determined by a closure operator (denoted cl), which assigns to any subset A ⊆ X its closure, or an interior operator (denoted int), which assigns to any subset A of X its interior. In these terms, a function
$$f\colon (X,\mathrm{cl}) \to (X' ,\mathrm{cl}')\,$$
between topological spaces is continuous in the sense above if and only if for all subsets A of X
$$f(\mathrm{cl}(A)) \subseteq \mathrm{cl}'(f(A)).$$
That is to say, given any element x of X that is in the closure of any subset A, f(x) belongs to the closure of f(A). This is equivalent to the requirement that for all subsets A' of X'
$$f^{-1}(\mathrm{cl}'(A')) \supseteq \mathrm{cl}(f^{-1}(A')).$$
Moreover,
$$f\colon (X,\mathrm{int}) \to (X' ,\mathrm{int}') \,$$
is continuous if and only if
$$f^{-1}(\mathrm{int}'(A)) \subseteq \mathrm{int}(f^{-1}(A))$$
for any subset A of X.

=== Properties ===
If f: X → Y and g: Y → Z are continuous, then so is the composition g ∘ f: X → Z. If f: X → Y is continuous and

- X is compact, then f(X) is compact.
- X is connected, then f(X) is connected.
- X is path-connected, then f(X) is path-connected.
- X is Lindelöf, then f(X) is Lindelöf.
- X is separable, then f(X) is separable.

The possible topologies on a fixed set X are partially ordered: a topology τ_{1} is said to be coarser than another topology τ_{2} (notation: τ_{1} ⊆ τ_{2}) if every open subset with respect to τ_{1} is also open with respect to τ_{2}. Then, the identity map

id_{X}: (X, τ_{2}) → (X, τ_{1})

is continuous if and only if τ_{1} ⊆ τ_{2} (see also comparison of topologies). More generally, a continuous function
$$(X, \tau_X) \rightarrow (Y, \tau_Y)$$
stays continuous if the topology τ_{Y} is replaced by a coarser topology and/or τ_{X} is replaced by a finer topology.

=== Homeomorphisms ===
Symmetric to the concept of a continuous map is an open map, for which images of open sets are open. In fact, if an open map f has an inverse function, that inverse is continuous, and if a continuous map g has an inverse, that inverse is open. Given a bijective function f between two topological spaces, the inverse function f^{−1} need not be continuous. A bijective continuous function with continuous inverse function is called a homeomorphism.

If a continuous bijection has as its domain a compact space and its codomain is Hausdorff, then it is a homeomorphism.

=== Defining topologies via continuous functions ===
Given a function
$$f\colon X \rightarrow S, \,$$
where X is a topological space and S is a set (without a specified topology), the final topology on S is defined by letting the open sets of S be those subsets A of S for which f^{−1}(A) is open in X. If S has an existing topology, f is continuous with respect to this topology if and only if the existing topology is coarser than the final topology on S. Thus the final topology can be characterized as the finest topology on S that makes f continuous. If f is surjective, this topology is canonically identified with the quotient topology under the equivalence relation defined by f.

Dually, for a function f from a set S to a topological space X, the initial topology on S has a basis of open sets given by those sets of the form f^{−1}(U) where U is open in X . If S has an existing topology, f is continuous with respect to this topology if and only if the existing topology is finer than the initial topology on S. Thus the initial topology can be characterized as the coarsest topology on S that makes f continuous. If f is injective, this topology is canonically identified with the subspace topology of S, viewed as a subset of X.

A topology on a set S is uniquely determined by the class of all continuous functions $S \rightarrow X$ into all topological spaces X. Dually, a similar idea can be applied to maps $X \rightarrow S.$

== Compact sets ==
Formally, a topological space X is called compact if each of its open covers has a finite subcover. Otherwise it is called non-compact. Explicitly, this means that for every arbitrary collection

$$\{U_\alpha\}_{\alpha\in A}$$

of open subsets of X such that

$$X = \bigcup_{\alpha\in A} U_\alpha,$$

there is a finite subset J of A such that

$$X = \bigcup_{i\in J} U_i.$$

Some branches of mathematics such as algebraic geometry, typically influenced by the French school of Bourbaki, use the term quasi-compact for the general notion, and reserve the term compact for topological spaces that are both Hausdorff and quasi-compact. A compact set is sometimes referred to as a compactum, plural compacta.

Every closed interval in R of finite length is compact. More is true: In R^{n}, a set is compact if and only if it is closed and bounded. (See Heine–Borel theorem).

Every continuous image of a compact space is compact.

A compact subset of a Hausdorff space is closed.

Every continuous bijection from a compact space to a Hausdorff space is necessarily a homeomorphism.

Every sequence of points in a compact metric space has a convergent subsequence.

Every compact finite-dimensional manifold can be embedded in some Euclidean space R^{n}.

== Connected sets ==
A topological space X is said to be disconnected if it is the union of two disjoint nonempty open sets. Otherwise, X is said to be connected. A subset of a topological space is said to be connected if it is connected under its subspace topology. Some authors exclude the empty set (with its unique topology) as a connected space, but this article does not follow that practice.

For a topological space X the following conditions are equivalent:

1. X is connected.
2. X cannot be divided into two disjoint nonempty closed sets.
3. The only subsets of X that are both open and closed (clopen sets) are X and the empty set.
4. The only subsets of X with empty boundary are X and the empty set.
5. X cannot be written as the union of two nonempty separated sets.
6. The only continuous functions from X to {0,1}, the two-point space endowed with the discrete topology, are constant.

Every interval in R is connected.

The continuous image of a connected space is connected.

=== Connected components ===
The maximal connected subsets (ordered by inclusion) of a nonempty topological space are called the connected components of the space. The components of any topological space X form a partition of X: they are disjoint, nonempty, and their union is the whole space. Every component is a closed subset of the original space. It follows that, in the case where their number is finite, each component is also an open subset. However, if their number is infinite, this might not be the case; for instance, the connected components of the set of the rational numbers are the one-point sets, which are not open.

Let $\Gamma_x$ be the connected component of x in a topological space X, and $\Gamma_x'$ be the intersection of all open-closed sets containing x (called quasi-component of x.) Then $\Gamma_x \subset \Gamma'_x$ where the equality holds if X is compact Hausdorff or locally connected.

=== Disconnected spaces ===
A space in which all components are one-point sets is called totally disconnected. Related to this property, a space X is called totally separated if, for any two distinct elements x and y of X, there exist disjoint open neighborhoods U of x and V of y such that X is the union of U and V. Clearly any totally separated space is totally disconnected, but the converse does not hold. For example, take two copies of the rational numbers Q, and identify them at every point except zero. The resulting space, with the quotient topology, is totally disconnected. However, by considering the two copies of zero, one sees that the space is not totally separated. In fact, it is not even Hausdorff, and the condition of being totally separated is strictly stronger than the condition of being Hausdorff.

=== Path-connected sets ===
This subspace of R² is path-connected, because a path can be drawn between any two points in the space.

A path from a point x to a point y in a topological space X is a continuous function f from the unit interval [0,1] to X with f(0) = x and f(1) = y. A path-component of X is an equivalence class of X under the equivalence relation, which makes x equivalent to y if there is a path from x to y. The space X is said to be path-connected (or pathwise connected or 0-connected) if there is at most one path-component; that is, if there is a path joining any two points in X. Again, many authors exclude the empty space.

Every path-connected space is connected. The converse is not always true: examples of connected spaces that are not path-connected include the extended long line L* and the topologist's sine curve.

However, subsets of the real line R are connected if and only if they are path-connected; these subsets are the intervals of R. Also, open subsets of R^{n} or C^{n} are connected if and only if they are path-connected. Additionally, connectedness and path-connectedness are the same for finite topological spaces.

== Products of spaces ==
Given X such that

$$X := \prod_{i \in I} X_i,$$

is the Cartesian product of the topological spaces X_{i}, indexed by $i \in I$, and the canonical projections p_{i} : X → X_{i}, the product topology on X is defined as the coarsest topology (i.e. the topology with the fewest open sets) for which all the projections p_{i} are continuous. The product topology is sometimes called the Tychonoff topology.

The open sets in the product topology are unions (finite or infinite) of sets of the form $\prod_{i\in I} U_i$, where each U_{i} is open in X_{i} and U_{i} ≠ X_{i} only finitely many times. In particular, for a finite product (in particular, for the product of two topological spaces), the products of base elements of the X_{i} gives a basis for the product $\prod_{i\in I} X_i$.

The product topology on X is the topology generated by sets of the form p_{i}^{−1}(U), where i is in I and U is an open subset of X_{i}. In other words, the sets {p_{i}^{−1}(U)} form a subbase for the topology on X. A subset of X is open if and only if it is a (possibly infinite) union of intersections of finitely many sets of the form p_{i}^{−1}(U). The p_{i}^{−1}(U) are sometimes called open cylinders, and their intersections are cylinder sets.

In general, the product of the topologies of each X_{i} forms a basis for what is called the box topology on X. In general, the box topology is finer than the product topology, but for finite products they coincide.

Related to compactness is Tychonoff's theorem: the (arbitrary) product of compact spaces is compact.

== Separation axioms ==
Many of these names have alternative meanings in some of mathematical literature, as explained on History of the separation axioms; for example, the meanings of "normal" and "T_{4}" are sometimes interchanged, similarly "regular" and "T_{3}", etc. Many of the concepts also have several names; however, the one listed first is always least likely to be ambiguous.

Most of these axioms have alternative definitions with the same meaning; the definitions given here fall into a consistent pattern that relates the various notions of separation defined in the previous section. Other possible definitions can be found in the individual articles.

In all of the following definitions, X is again a topological space.

- X is T_{0}, or Kolmogorov, if any two distinct points in X are topologically distinguishable. (It is a common theme among the separation axioms to have one version of an axiom that requires T_{0} and one version that doesn't.)
- X is T_{1}, or accessible or Fréchet, if any two distinct points in X are separated. Thus, X is T_{1} if and only if it is both T_{0} and R_{0}. (Though you may say such things as T_{1} space, Fréchet topology, and Suppose that the topological space X is Fréchet, avoid saying Fréchet space in this context, since there is another entirely different notion of Fréchet space in functional analysis.)
- X is Hausdorff, or T_{2} or separated, if any two distinct points in X are separated by neighbourhoods. Thus, X is Hausdorff if and only if it is both T_{0} and R_{1}. A Hausdorff space must also be T_{1}.
- X is T_{2½}, or Urysohn, if any two distinct points in X are separated by closed neighbourhoods. A T_{2½} space must also be Hausdorff.
- X is regular, or T_{3}, if it is T_{0} and if given any point x and closed set F in X such that x does not belong to F, they are separated by neighbourhoods. (In fact, in a regular space, any such x and F is also separated by closed neighbourhoods.)
- X is Tychonoff, or T_{3½}, completely T_{3}, or completely regular, if it is T_{0} and if f, given any point x and closed set F in X such that x does not belong to F, they are separated by a continuous function.
- X is normal, or T_{4}, if it is Hausdorff and if any two disjoint closed subsets of X are separated by neighbourhoods. (In fact, a space is normal if and only if any two disjoint closed sets can be separated by a continuous function; this is Urysohn's lemma.)
- X is completely normal, or T_{5} or completely T_{4}, if it is T_{1} and if any two separated sets are separated by neighbourhoods. A completely normal space must also be normal.
- X is perfectly normal, or T_{6} or perfectly T_{4}, if it is T_{1} and if any two disjoint closed sets are precisely separated by a continuous function. A perfectly normal Hausdorff space must also be completely normal Hausdorff.

The Tietze extension theorem: In a normal space, every continuous real-valued function defined on a closed subspace can be extended to a continuous map defined on the whole space.

== Countability axioms ==
An axiom of countability is a property of certain mathematical objects (usually in a category) that requires the existence of a countable set with certain properties, while without it such sets might not exist.

Important countability axioms for topological spaces:

- sequential space: a set is open if every sequence convergent to a point in the set is eventually in the set
- first-countable space: every point has a countable neighbourhood basis (local base)
- second-countable space: the topology has a countable base
- separable space: there exists a countable dense subspace
- Lindelöf space: every open cover has a countable subcover
- σ-compact space: there exists a countable cover by compact spaces

Relations:

- Every first countable space is sequential.
- Every second-countable space is first-countable, separable, and Lindelöf.
- Every σ-compact space is Lindelöf.
- A metric space is first-countable.
- For metric spaces second-countability, separability, and the Lindelöf property are all equivalent.

== Metric spaces ==
A metric space is an ordered pair $(M,d)$ where $M$ is a set and $d$ is a metric on $M$, i.e., a function

$$d \colon M \times M \rightarrow \mathbb{R}$$

such that for any $x, y, z \in M$, the following holds:

1. $d(x,y) \ge 0$ (non-negative),
2. $d(x,y) = 0\,$ iff $x = y\,$ (identity of indiscernibles),
3. $d(x,y) = d(y,x)\,$ (symmetry) and
4. $d(x,z) \le d(x,y) + d(y,z)$ (triangle inequality) .

The function $d$ is also called distance function or simply distance. Often, $d$ is omitted and one just writes $M$ for a metric space if it is clear from the context what metric is used.

Every metric space is paracompact and Hausdorff, and thus normal.

The metrization theorems provide necessary and sufficient conditions for a topology to come from a metric.

== Baire category theorem ==
The Baire category theorem says: If X is a complete metric space or a locally compact Hausdorff space, then the interior of every union of countably many nowhere dense sets is empty.

Any open subspace of a Baire space is itself a Baire space.

== Main areas of research ==
Three iterations of a Peano curve construction, whose limit is a space-filling curve. The Peano curve is studied in continuum theory, a branch of general topology.

=== Continuum theory ===
A continuum (pl continua) is a nonempty compact connected metric space, or less frequently, a compact connected Hausdorff space. Continuum theory is the branch of topology devoted to the study of continua. These objects arise frequently in nearly all areas of topology and analysis, and their properties are strong enough to yield many 'geometric' features.

=== Dynamical systems ===
Topological dynamics concerns the behavior of a space and its subspaces over time when subjected to continuous change. Many examples with applications to physics and other areas of math include fluid dynamics, billiards and flows on manifolds. The topological characteristics of fractals in fractal geometry, of Julia sets and the Mandelbrot set arising in complex dynamics, and of attractors in differential equations are often critical to understanding these systems.

=== Pointless topology ===
Pointless topology (also called point-free or pointfree topology) is an approach to topology that avoids mentioning points. The name 'pointless topology' is due to John von Neumann. The ideas of pointless topology are closely related to mereotopologies, in which regions (sets) are treated as foundational without explicit reference to underlying point sets.

=== Dimension theory ===
Dimension theory is a branch of general topology dealing with dimensional invariants of topological spaces.

=== Topological algebras ===
A topological algebra A over a topological field K is a topological vector space together with a continuous multiplication

$$\cdot :A\times A \longrightarrow A$$
$$(a,b)\longmapsto a\cdot b$$

that makes it an algebra over K. A unital associative topological algebra is a topological ring.

The term was coined by David van Dantzig; it appears in the title of his doctoral dissertation (1931).

=== Metrizability theory ===
In topology and related areas of mathematics, a metrizable space is a topological space that is homeomorphic to a metric space. That is, a topological space $(X,\tau)$ is said to be metrizable if there is a metric
$$d\colon X \times X \to [0,\infty)$$

such that the topology induced by d is $\tau$. Metrization theorems are theorems that give sufficient conditions for a topological space to be metrizable.

=== Set-theoretic topology ===
Set-theoretic topology is a subject that combines set theory and general topology. It focuses on topological questions that are independent of Zermelo–Fraenkel set theory (ZFC). A famous problem is the normal Moore space question, a question in general topology that was the subject of intense research. The answer to the normal Moore space question was eventually proved to be independent of ZFC.

== See also ==
- List of examples in general topology
- Glossary of general topology for detailed definitions
- List of general topology topics for related articles
- Category of topological spaces
