= Double origin topology =

Example of topological space

In mathematics, more specifically general topology, the double origin topology is an example of a topology given to the plane R^{2} with an extra point, say 0*, added. In this case, the double origin topology gives a topology on the set X = R^{2} ⊔ {0*}, where ⊔ denotes the disjoint union.

== Construction ==
Given a point x belonging to X, such that x ≠ 0 and x ≠ 0*, the neighbourhoods of x are those given by the standard metric topology on R^{2}−{0}. We define a countably infinite basis of neighbourhoods about the point 0 and about the additional point 0*. For the point 0, the basis, indexed by n, is defined to be:
$$\ N(0,n) = \{ (x,y) \in {\mathbf R}^2 : x^2 + y^2  < 1/n^2, \ y > 0\} \cup \{0\} .$$
In a similar way, the basis of neighbourhoods of 0* is defined to be:
$$N(0^*,n) = \{ (x,y) \in {\mathbf R}^2 : x^2 + y^2  < 1/n^2, \ y < 0\} \cup \{0^*\} .$$

== Properties ==
The space R^{2} ⊔ {0*}, along with the double origin topology is an example of a Hausdorff space, although it is not completely Hausdorff. Since it has a base of regular open sets, it is an example of a semiregular space that is not regular. In terms of compactness, the space R^{2} ⊔ {0*}, along with the double origin topology fails to be either compact, paracompact or locally compact, however, X is second countable. Finally, it is an example of an arc connected space.
