= Partition topology =

In mathematics, a partition topology is a topology that can be induced on any set $X$ by partitioning $X$ into disjoint subsets $P;$ these subsets form the basis for the topology. There are two important examples which have their own names:

- The odd–even topology is the topology where $X = \N$ and $P = {\left\{~\{2k-1, 2k\} : k \in \N\right\} }.$ Equivalently, $P = \{~ \{1,2\}, \{3,4\},\{5,6\}, \ldots\}.$
- The deleted integer topology is defined by letting
  $$X = \begin{matrix} \bigcup_{n \in \N} (n-1,n) \subseteq \Reals \end{matrix}$$
  and $P = {\left\{(0,1), (1,2), (2,3), \ldots\right\} }.$

The trivial partitions yield the discrete topology (each point of $X$ is a set in $P,$ so $P = \{~ \{x\} ~ : ~ x \in X ~\}$) or indiscrete topology (the entire set $X$ is in $P,$ so $P = \{X\}$).

Any set $X$ with a partition topology generated by a partition $P$ can be viewed as a pseudometric space with a pseudometric given by:
$$d(x, y) = \begin{cases} 0 & \text{if } x \text{ and } y \text{ are in the same partition element} \\
1 & \text{otherwise}.
\end{cases}$$

This is not a metric unless $P$ yields the discrete topology.

The partition topology provides an important example of the independence of various separation axioms. Unless $P$ is trivial, at least one set in $P$ contains more than one point, and the elements of this set are topologically indistinguishable: the topology does not separate points. Hence $X$ is not a Kolmogorov space, nor a T_{1} space, a Hausdorff space or an Urysohn space. In a partition topology the complement of every open set is also open, and therefore a set is open if and only if it is closed. Therefore, $X$ is regular, completely regular, normal and completely normal. $X / P$ is the discrete topology.

== See also ==
- List of topologies – List of concrete topologies and topological spaces
