= Tychonoff plank =

Topological space in mathematics

In topology, the Tychonoff plank is a topological space defined using ordinal spaces that is a counterexample to several plausible-sounding conjectures. It is defined as the topological product of the two ordinal spaces $[0,\omega_1]$ and $[0,\omega]$, where $\omega$ is the first infinite ordinal and $\omega_1$ the first uncountable ordinal. The deleted Tychonoff plank is obtained by deleting the point $\infty = (\omega_1,\omega)$.

== Definition ==
Let $\Omega$ be the set of ordinals which are less than or equal to $\omega$ and $\Omega_1$ the set of ordinals less than or equal to $\omega_1$. The Tychonoff plank is defined as the set $\Omega \times \Omega_1$ with the product topology.

The deleted Tychonoff plank is the subset $S = \Omega \times \Omega_1 \setminus \{ (\omega,\omega_1) \}$, where $S$ is the plank with a corner removed.

== Properties ==
The Tychonoff plank is a compact Hausdorff space and is therefore a normal space. However, the deleted Tychonoff plank is non-normal. Therefore the Tychonoff plank is not completely normal. This shows that a subspace of a normal space need not be normal. The Tychonoff plank is not perfectly normal because it is not a G_{δ} space: the singleton $\{\infty\}$ is closed but not a G_{δ} set.

The Stone–Čech compactification of the deleted Tychonoff plank is the Tychonoff plank.

== See also ==
- List of topologies
