= Vague topology =

In mathematics, particularly in the area of functional analysis and topological vector spaces, the vague topology is an example of the weak-* topology which arises in the study of measures on locally compact Hausdorff spaces.

Let $X$ be a locally compact Hausdorff space. Let $M(X)$ be the space of complex Radon measures on $X,$ and $C_0(X)^*$ denote the dual of $C_0(X),$ the Banach space of complex continuous functions on $X$ vanishing at infinity equipped with the uniform norm. By the Riesz representation theorem $M(X)$ is isometric to $C_0(X)^*.$ The isometry maps a measure $\mu$ to a linear functional $I_\mu(f) := \int_X f\, d\mu.$

The vague topology is the weak-* topology on $C_0(X)^*.$ The corresponding topology on $M(X)$ induced by the isometry from $C_0(X)^*$ is also called the vague topology on $M(X).$ Thus in particular, a sequence of measures $\left(\mu_n\right)_{n \in \N}$ converges vaguely to a measure $\mu$ whenever for all test functions $f \in C_0(X),$

$$\int_X f d\mu_n \to \int_X f d\mu.$$

It is also not uncommon to define the vague topology by duality with continuous functions having compact support $C_c(X),$ that is, a sequence of measures $\left(\mu_n\right)_{n \in \N}$ converges vaguely to a measure $\mu$ whenever the above convergence holds for all test functions $f \in C_c(X).$ This construction gives rise to a different topology. In particular, the topology defined by duality with $C_c(X)$ can be metrizable whereas the topology defined by duality with $C_0(X)$ is not.

One application of this is to probability theory: for example, the central limit theorem is essentially a statement that if $\mu_n$ are the probability measures for certain sums of independent random variables, then $\mu_n$ converge weakly (and then vaguely) to a normal distribution, that is, the measure $\mu_n$ is "approximately normal" for large $n.$

== See also ==
- List of topologies – List of concrete topologies and topological spaces
