= Gδ space =

Property of topological space

In mathematics, particularly topology, a G_{δ} space is a topological space in which closed sets are in a way ‘separated’ from their complements using only countably many open sets. A G_{δ} space may thus be regarded as a space satisfying a different kind of separation axiom. In fact normal G_{δ} spaces are referred to as perfectly normal spaces, and satisfy the strongest of separation axioms.

G_{δ} spaces are also called perfect spaces. The term perfect is also used, incompatibly, to refer to a space with no isolated points; see Perfect set.

== Definition ==
A countable intersection of open sets in a topological space is called a G_{δ} set. Trivially, every open set is a G_{δ} set. Dually, a countable union of closed sets is called an F_{σ} set. Trivially, every closed set is an F_{σ} set.

A topological space X is called a G_{δ} space if every closed subset of X is a G_{δ} set. Dually and equivalently, a G_{δ} space is a space in which every open set is an F_{σ} set.

== Properties and examples ==
- Every subspace of a G_{δ} space is a G_{δ} space.
- Every metrizable space is a G_{δ} space. The same holds for pseudometrizable spaces.
- Every second countable regular space is a G_{δ} space. This follows from the Urysohn's metrization theorem in the Hausdorff case, but can easily be shown directly.
- Every countable regular space is a G_{δ} space.
- Every hereditarily Lindelöf regular space is a G_{δ} space. Such spaces are in fact perfectly normal. This generalizes the previous two items about second countable and countable regular spaces.
- A G_{δ} space need not be normal, as R endowed with the K-topology shows. That example is not a regular space. Examples of Tychonoff G_{δ} spaces that are not normal are the Sorgenfrey plane and the Niemytzki plane.
- In a first countable T_{1} space, every singleton is a G_{δ} set. That is not enough for the space to be a G_{δ} space, as shown for example by the lexicographic order topology on the unit square.
- The Sorgenfrey line is an example of a perfectly normal (i.e. normal G_{δ}) space that is not metrizable.
- The topological sum $X={\coprod}_i X_i$ of a family of disjoint topological spaces is a G_{δ} space if and only if each $X_i$ is a G_{δ} space.
