= Interlocking interval topology =

In mathematics, and especially general topology, the interlocking interval topology is an example of a topology on the set S := R^{+} \ Z^{+}, i.e. the set of all positive real numbers that are not positive whole numbers.

== Construction ==
The open sets in this topology are taken to be the whole set S, the empty set ∅, and the sets generated by

$$X_n := \left(0,\frac{1}{n}\right) \cup (n,n+1) = \left\{ x \in {\mathbf R}^+ : 0 < x < \frac{1}{n} \ \text{ or } \ n < x < n+1 \right\}.$$

The sets generated by X_{n} will be formed by all possible unions of finite intersections of the X_{n}.

== See also ==
- List of topologies
