= Erdős space =

Totally disconnected topological space

In mathematics, the Erdős space is a topological subspace of the sequence space $\ell^2$. It consists of the sequences whose elements are all rational numbers. It is named after Paul Erdős, who first described it in 1940.

The Erdős space $E$ is a totally disconnected, one-dimensional topological space. It is homeomorphic to $E\times E$ in the product topology, and to the set of homeomorphisms of Euclidean space $\R^n$ (for $n\geq 2$) that fix $\Q^n$, endowed with the compact-open topology.

The Erdős space also surfaces in complex dynamics via iteration of the function $f(z)=e^z-1$. Indeed, the set of all points $z\in \C$ such that $|\operatorname{Im}(f^{\circ n}(z))|\to\infty$ as $n\to\infty$ is a collection of pairwise disjoint rays, that is, homeomorphic copies of $[0,\infty)$, each joining an endpoint in $\mathbb C$ to the point at infinity. The set of finite endpoints is then homeomorphic to the Erdős space.

== See also ==
- List of topologies
