= Lexicographic order topology on the unit square =

Example of topological space

In general topology, the lexicographic ordering on the unit square (sometimes the dictionary order on the unit square) is a topology on the unit square S, i.e. on the set of points (x,y) in the plane such that 0 ≤ x ≤ 1 and 0 ≤ y ≤ 1.

== Construction ==
The lexicographical ordering gives a total ordering $\prec$ on the points in the unit square: if (x,y) and (u,v) are two points in the square, (x,y) $\scriptstyle\prec$ (u,v) if and only if either x < u or both x = u and y < v. Stated symbolically,
$$(x,y)\prec (u,v)\iff (x<u) \lor (x=u\land y<v)$$

The lexicographic order topology on the unit square is the order topology induced by this ordering.

== Properties ==
The order topology makes S into a completely normal Hausdorff space. Since the lexicographical order on S can be proven to be complete, this topology makes S into a compact space. At the same time, S contains an uncountable number of pairwise disjoint open intervals, each homeomorphic to the real line, for example the intervals $U_x=\{(x,y):1/4<y<1/2\}$ for $0\le x\le 1$. So S is not separable, since any dense subset has to contain at least one point in each $U_x$. Hence S is not metrizable (since any compact metric space is separable); however, it is first countable. Also, S is connected and locally connected, but not path connected and not locally path connected. Its fundamental group is trivial.

== See also ==
- List of topologies
- Long line
