= Semiregular space =

A semiregular space is a topological space whose regular open sets (sets that equal the interiors of their closures) form a base for the topology.

== Properties and examples ==
Every regular space is semiregular. The converse is not true. For example, the space $X = \Reals^2 \cup \{0^*\}$ with the double origin topology and the Arens square are Hausdorff semiregular spaces that are not regular.

Open subspaces of a semiregular space are semiregular. But arbitrary subspaces, even closed subspaces, need not be semiregular.

The product of an arbitrary family of semiregular spaces is semiregular.

Every topological space may be embedded into a semiregular space.

== See also ==
- Separation axiom – Axioms in topology defining notions of "separation"
