= Natural topology =

Notion in topology

The 2-sphere is usually considered as a subspace of 3-dimensional Euclidean space, so its natural topology is inherited from the Euclidean topology.

In any domain of mathematics, a space has a natural topology if there is a topology on the space which is "best adapted" to its study within the domain in question. In many cases this imprecise definition means little more than the assertion that the topology in question arises naturally or canonically (see mathematical jargon) in the given context.

Note that in some cases multiple topologies seem "natural". For example, if Y is a subset of a totally ordered set X, then the induced order topology, i.e. the order topology of the totally ordered Y, where this order is inherited from X, is coarser than the subspace topology of the order topology of X.

"Natural topology" does quite often have a more specific meaning, at least given some prior contextual information: the natural topology is a topology which makes a natural map or collection of maps continuous. This is still imprecise, even once one has specified what the natural maps are, because there may be many topologies with the required property. However, there is often a finest or coarsest topology which makes the given maps continuous, in which case these are obvious candidates for the natural topology.

The simplest cases (which nevertheless cover many examples) are the initial topology and the final topology (Willard (1970)). The initial topology is the coarsest topology on a space X which makes a given collection of maps from X to topological spaces X_{i} continuous. The final topology is the finest topology on a space X which makes a given collection of maps from topological spaces X_{i} to X continuous.

Two of the simplest examples are the natural topologies of subspaces and quotient spaces.

- The natural topology on a subset of a topological space is the subspace topology. This is the coarsest topology which makes the inclusion map continuous.
- The natural topology on a quotient of a topological space is the quotient topology. This is the finest topology which makes the quotient map continuous.

Another example is that any metric space has a natural topology induced by its metric.

== See also ==
- Induced topology
