= Linear flow on the torus =

In mathematics, especially in the area of mathematical analysis known as dynamical systems theory, a linear flow on the torus is a flow on the n-dimensional torus
$$\mathbb{T}^n = \underbrace{S^1 \times S^1 \times \cdots \times S^1}_n,$$
which is represented by the following differential equations with respect to the standard angular coordinates $\left(\theta_1, \theta_2, \ldots, \theta_n\right):$
$$\frac{d\theta_1}{dt} = \omega_1, \quad \frac{d\theta_2}{dt} = \omega_2,\quad \ldots, \quad \frac{d\theta_n}{dt} = \omega_n.$$
The solution of these equations can explicitly be expressed as
$$\Phi_\omega^t(\theta_1, \theta_2, \dots, \theta_n) = (\theta_1 + \omega_1 t, \theta_2 + \omega_2 t, \dots, \theta_n + \omega_n t) \bmod 2 \pi.$$
If we represent the torus as $\mathbb{T}^n = \Reals^n / \Z^n$ we see that a starting point is moved by the flow in the direction $\omega = \left(\omega_1, \omega_2, \ldots, \omega_n\right)$ at constant speed and when it reaches the border of the unitary $n$-cube it jumps to the opposite face of the cube.

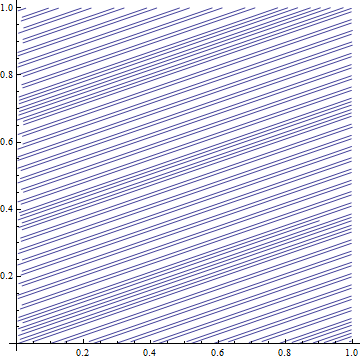
Irrational rotation on a 2-torus

For a linear flow on the torus, all orbits are either periodic or dense on a subset of the $n$-torus, which is a $k$-torus. When the components of $\omega$ are rationally independent all the orbits are dense on the whole space. This can be easily seen in the two-dimensional case: if the two components of $\omega$ are rationally independent, the Poincaré section of the flow on an edge of the unit square is an irrational rotation on a circle and therefore its orbits are dense on the circle, as a consequence the orbits of the flow must be dense on the torus.

== Irrational winding of a torus ==
In topology, an irrational winding of a torus is a continuous injection of a line into a two-dimensional torus that is used to set up several counterexamples. A related notion is the Kronecker foliation of a torus, a foliation formed by the set of all translates of a given irrational winding.

=== Definition ===
One way of constructing a torus is as the quotient space $\mathbb{T^2} = \Reals^2 / \Z^2$ of a two-dimensional real vector space by the additive subgroup of integer vectors, with the corresponding projection $\pi : \Reals^2 \to \mathbb{T^2}.$ Each point in the torus has as its preimage one of the translates of the square lattice $\Z^2$ in $\Reals^2,$ and $\pi$ factors through a map that takes any point in the plane to a point in the unit square $[0, 1)^2$ given by the fractional parts of the original point's Cartesian coordinates.

Now consider a line in $\Reals^2$ given by the equation $y = k x.$ If the slope $k$ of the line is rational, it can be represented by a fraction and a corresponding lattice point of $\Z^2.$ It can be shown that then the projection of this line is a simple closed curve on a torus.

If, however, $k$ is irrational, it will not cross any lattice points except 0, which means that its projection on the torus will not be a closed curve, and the restriction of $\pi$ on this line is injective. Moreover, it can be shown that the image of this restricted projection as a subspace, called the irrational winding of a torus, is dense in the torus.

=== Applications ===
Irrational windings of a torus may be used to set up counter-examples related to monomorphisms. An irrational winding is an immersed submanifold but not a regular submanifold of the torus, which shows that the image of a manifold under a continuous injection to another manifold is not necessarily a (regular) submanifold. Irrational windings are also examples of the fact that the topology of the submanifold does not have to coincide with the subspace topology of the submanifold.

Secondly, the torus can be considered as a Lie group $U(1) \times U(1)$, and the line can be considered as $\mathbb{R}$. It is then easy to show that the image of the continuous and analytic group homomorphism $x \mapsto \left(e^{ix}, e^{ikx}\right)$ is not a regular submanifold for irrational $k,$ although it is an immersed submanifold, and therefore a Lie subgroup. It may also be used to show that if a subgroup $H$ of the Lie group $G$ is not closed, the quotient $G / H$ does not need to be a manifold and might even fail to be a Hausdorff space.

== See also ==
- Completely integrable system – Property of certain dynamical systems
- Ergodic theory – Branch of mathematics that studies dynamical systems
- List of topologies – List of concrete topologies and topological spaces
- Quasiperiodic motion – Type of motion that is approximately periodic
- Torus knot – Knot which lies on the surface of a torus in 3-dimensional space

== Notes ==
a: As a topological subspace of the torus, the irrational winding is not a manifold at all because it is not locally homeomorphic to $\Reals$.

== Bibliography ==
- Katok, Anatole; Hasselblatt, Boris (1996). Introduction to the modern theory of dynamical systems. Cambridge. ISBN 0-521-57557-5.
