= Hilbert cube =

Type of topological space

In mathematics, the Hilbert cube, named after David Hilbert, is a topological space that provides an instructive example of some ideas in topology. Furthermore, many interesting topological spaces can be embedded in the Hilbert cube; that is, can be viewed as subspaces of the Hilbert cube (see below).

== Definition ==
The Hilbert cube is best defined as the topological product of the intervals $[0, 1/n]$ for $n = 1, 2, 3, 4, \ldots.$ That is, it is a cuboid of countably infinite dimension, where the lengths of the edges in each orthogonal direction form the sequence $\left( 1/n \right)_{n \in \N}.$

The Hilbert cube is homeomorphic to the product of countably infinitely many copies of the unit interval $[0, 1].$ In other words, it is topologically indistinguishable from the unit cube of countably infinite dimension. Some authors use the term "Hilbert cube" to mean this Cartesian product instead of the product of the $\left[0, \tfrac{1}{n}\right]$.

If a point in the Hilbert cube is specified by a sequence $\left( a_n \right)_{n \in \N}$ with $0 \leq a_n \leq 1/n,$ then a homeomorphism to the infinite dimensional unit cube is given by $h(a)_n = n \cdot a_n.$

== The Hilbert cube as a metric space ==
It is sometimes convenient to think of the Hilbert cube as a metric space, indeed as a specific subset of a separable Hilbert space (that is, a Hilbert space with a countably infinite Hilbert basis). For these purposes, it is best not to think of it as a product of copies of $[0, 1],$ but instead as
$$[0, 1] \times [0, 1/2] \times [0, 1/3] \times \cdots;$$
as stated above, for topological properties, this makes no difference. That is, an element of the Hilbert cube is an infinite sequence
$$\left(x_n\right)_{n \in \N}$$
that satisfies
$$0 \leq x_n \leq 1/n.$$

Any such sequence belongs to the Hilbert space $\ell^2,$ so the Hilbert cube inherits a metric from there. One can show that the topology induced by the metric is the same as the product topology in the above definition.

== Properties ==
As a product of compact Hausdorff spaces, the Hilbert cube is itself a compact Hausdorff space as a result of the Tychonoff theorem. The compactness of the Hilbert cube can also be proved without the axiom of choice by constructing a continuous function from the usual Cantor set onto the Hilbert cube.

In $\ell^2,$ no point has a compact neighbourhood (thus, $\ell^2$ is not locally compact). One might expect that all of the compact subsets of $\ell^2$ are finite-dimensional. The Hilbert cube shows that this is not the case. But the Hilbert cube fails to be a neighbourhood of any point $p$ because its side becomes smaller and smaller in each dimension, so that an open ball around $p$ of any fixed radius $\epsilon > 0$ must go outside the cube in some dimension.

The Hilbert cube is a convex set, whose span is dense in the whole space, but whose interior is empty. This situation is impossible in finite dimensions. The closed tangent cone to the cube at the zero vector is the whole space.

Let $K$ be any infinite-dimensional, compact, convex subset of $\ell^2$; or more generally, any such subset of a locally convex topological vector space such that $K$ is also metrizable; or more generally still, any such subset of a metrizable space such that $K$ is also an absolute retract. Then $K$ is homeomorphic to the Hilbert cube.

Every subset of the Hilbert cube inherits from the Hilbert cube the properties of being both metrizable (and therefore T4) and second countable. It is more interesting that the converse also holds: Every second countable T4 space is homeomorphic to a subset of the Hilbert cube.

In particular, every G_{δ}-subset of the Hilbert cube is a Polish space, a topological space homeomorphic to a separable and complete metric space. Conversely, every Polish space is homeomorphic to a G_{δ}-subset of the Hilbert cube.

== See also ==
- List of topologies – List of concrete topologies and topological spaces
