= Euclidean topology =

Topological structure of Euclidean space

In mathematics, and especially general topology, the Euclidean topology is the natural topology induced on $n$-dimensional Euclidean space $\R^n$ by the Euclidean metric.

== Definition ==
The Euclidean norm on $\R^n$ is the non-negative function $\|\cdot\| : \R^n \to \R$ defined by
$$\left\|\left(p_1, \ldots, p_n\right)\right\| ~:=~ \sqrt{p_1^2 + \cdots + p_n^2}.$$

Like all norms, it induces a canonical metric defined by $d(p, q) = \|p - q\|.$ The metric $d : \R^n \times \R^n \to \R$ induced by the Euclidean norm is called the Euclidean metric or the Euclidean distance and the distance between points $p = \left(p_1, \ldots, p_n\right)$ and $q = \left(q_1, \ldots, q_n\right)$ is
$$d(p, q) ~=~ \|p - q\| ~=~ \sqrt{\left(p_1 - q_1\right)^2 + \left(p_2 - q_2\right)^2 + \cdots + \left(p_i - q_i\right)^2 + \cdots + \left(p_n - q_n\right)^2}.$$

In any metric space, the open balls form a base for a topology on that space. The Euclidean topology on $\R^n$ is the topology generated by these balls. In other words, the open sets of the Euclidean topology on $\R^n$ are given by (arbitrary) unions of the open balls $B_r(p)$ defined as $B_r(p) := \left\{x \in \R^n : d(p,x) < r\right\},$ for all real $r > 0$ and all $p \in \R^n,$ where $d$ is the Euclidean metric.

== Properties ==
When endowed with this topology, the real line $\R$ is a T_{5} space. Given two subsets say $A$ and $B$ of $\R$ with $\overline{A} \cap B = A \cap \overline{B} = \varnothing,$ where $\overline{A}$ denotes the closure of $A,$ there exist open sets $S_A$ and $S_B$ with $A \subseteq S_A$ and $B \subseteq S_B$ such that $S_A \cap S_B = \varnothing.$

== See also ==
- Hilbert space – Type of vector space in math
- List of Banach spaces
- List of topologies – List of concrete topologies and topological spaces
