= Order topology =

Certain topology in mathematics

In mathematics, an order topology is a specific topology that can be defined on any totally ordered set. It is a natural generalization of the topology of the real numbers to arbitrary totally ordered sets.

If X is a totally ordered set, the order topology on X is generated by the subbase of "open rays"

$$\{ x \mid a < x\}$$
$$\{x \mid x < b\}$$

for all a, b in X. Provided X has at least two elements, this is equivalent to saying that the open intervals

$$(a,b) = \{x \mid a < x < b\}$$

together with the above rays form a base for the order topology. The open sets in X are the sets that are a union of (possibly infinitely many) such open intervals and rays.

A topological space X is called orderable or linearly orderable if there exists a total order on its elements such that the order topology induced by that order and the given topology on X coincide. The order topology makes X into a completely normal Hausdorff space.

The standard topologies on R, Q, Z, and N are the order topologies.

== Induced order topology ==
If Y is a subset of X, X a totally ordered set, then Y inherits a total order from X. The set Y therefore has an order topology, the induced order topology. As a subset of X, Y also has a subspace topology. The subspace topology is always at least as fine as the induced order topology, but they are not in general the same.

For example, consider the subset Y = {−1} ∪ {1/n}_{n∈N} of the rationals. Under the subspace topology, the singleton set {−1} is open in Y, but under the induced order topology, any open set containing −1 must contain all but finitely many members of the space.

== Example of a subspace of a linearly ordered space whose topology is not an order topology ==
Though the subspace topology of Y = {−1} ∪ {1/n}_{n∈N} in the section above is shown not to be generated by the induced order on Y, it is nonetheless an order topology on Y; indeed, in the subspace topology every point is isolated (i.e., singleton {y} is open in Y for every y in Y), so the subspace topology is the discrete topology on Y (the topology in which every subset of Y is open), and the discrete topology on any set is an order topology. To define a total order on Y that generates the discrete topology on Y, simply modify the induced order on Y by defining −1 to be the greatest element of Y and otherwise keeping the same order for the other points, so that in this new order (call it say <_{1}) we have 1/n <_{1} −1 for all n ∈ N. Then, in the order topology on Y generated by <_{1}, every point of Y is isolated in Y.

We wish to define here a subset Z of a linearly ordered topological space X such that no total order on Z generates the subspace topology on Z, so that the subspace topology will not be an order topology even though it is the subspace topology of a space whose topology is an order topology.

Let $Z = \{-1\} \cup (0,1)$ in the real line. The same argument as before shows that the subspace topology on Z is not equal to the induced order topology on Z, but one can show that the subspace topology on Z cannot be equal to any order topology on Z.

An argument follows. Suppose by way of contradiction that there is some strict total order < on Z such that the order topology generated by < is equal to the subspace topology on Z (note that we are not assuming that < is the induced order on Z, but rather an arbitrarily given total order on Z that generates the subspace topology).

Let M = Z \ {−1} = (0,1), then M is connected, so M is dense on itself and has no gaps, in regards to <. If −1 is not the smallest or the largest element of Z, then $(-\infty,-1)$ and $(-1,\infty)$ separate M, a contradiction. Assume without loss of generality that −1 is the smallest element of Z. Since {−1} is open in Z, there is some point p in M such that the interval (−1,p) is empty, so p is the minimum of M. Then M \ {p} = (0,p) ∪ (p,1) is not connected with respect to the subspace topology inherited from R. On the other hand, the subspace topology of M \ {p} inherited from the order topology of Z coincides with the order topology of M \ {p} induced by <, which is connected since there are no gaps in M \ {p} and it is dense. This is a contradiction.

== Left and right order topologies ==
Several variants of the order topology can be given:

- The right order topology on X is the topology having as a base all intervals of the form $(a,\infty)=\{x\in X\mid x>a\}$, together with the set X.
- The left order topology on X is the topology having as a base all intervals of the form $(-\infty,a)=\{x\in X\mid x<a\}$, together with the set X.

These topologies naturally arise when working with semicontinuous functions, in that a real-valued function on a topological space is lower semicontinuous if and only if it is continuous when the reals are equipped with the right order. The (natural) compact open topology on the resulting set of continuous functions is sometimes referred to as the semicontinuous topology.

Additionally, these topologies can be used to give counterexamples in general topology. For example, the left or right order topology on a bounded set provides an example of a compact space that is not Hausdorff.

The left order topology is the standard topology used for many set-theoretic purposes on a Boolean algebra.

== Ordinal space ==
For any ordinal number λ one can consider the spaces of ordinal numbers

$$[0,\lambda) = \{\alpha \mid \alpha < \lambda\}$$
$$[0,\lambda] = \{\alpha \mid \alpha \le \lambda\}$$

together with the natural order topology. These spaces are called ordinal spaces. (Note that in the usual set-theoretic construction of ordinal numbers we have λ = [0, λ) and λ + 1 = [0, λ]). Obviously, these spaces are mostly of interest when λ is an infinite ordinal; for finite ordinals, the order topology is simply the discrete topology.

When λ = ω (the first infinite ordinal), the space [0,ω) is just N with the usual (still discrete) topology, while [0,ω] is the one-point compactification of N.

Of particular interest is the case when λ = ω_{1}, the set of all countable ordinals, and the first uncountable ordinal. The element ω_{1} is a limit point of the subset [0,ω_{1}) even though no sequence of elements in [0,ω_{1}) has the element ω_{1} as its limit. In particular, [0,ω_{1}] is not first-countable. The subspace [0,ω_{1}) is first-countable however, since the only point in [0,ω_{1}] without a countable local base is ω_{1}. Some further properties include

- neither [0,ω_{1}) or [0,ω_{1}] is separable or second-countable
- [0,ω_{1}] is compact, while [0,ω_{1}) is sequentially compact and countably compact, but not compact or paracompact

== Topology and ordinals ==
=== Ordinals as topological spaces ===
Any ordinal number can be viewed as a topological space by endowing it with the order topology (indeed, ordinals are well-ordered, so in particular totally ordered). Unless otherwise specified, this is the usual topology given to ordinals. Moreover, if we are willing to accept a proper class as a topological space, then we may similarly view the class of all ordinals as a topological space with the order topology.

The set of limit points of an ordinal α is precisely the set of limit ordinals less than α. Successor ordinals (and zero) less than α are isolated points in α. In particular, ω (meaning the set [0, ω)) is a discrete topological space, as is each finite ordinal, but no ordinal greater than ω is discrete. The ordinal α is compact as a topological space if and only if α is either a successor ordinal or zero.

The closed sets of an ordinal α are those that contain a limit ordinal less than α whenever every open interval that contains the limit ordinal intersects the set.

Any ordinal is, of course, an open subset of any larger ordinal. We can also define the topology on the ordinals in the following inductive way: 0 is the empty topological space, α+1 is obtained by taking the one-point compactification of α, and for δ a limit ordinal, δ is equipped with the inductive limit topology. Note that if α is a successor ordinal, then α is compact, in which case its one-point compactification α+1 is the disjoint union of α and a point.

As topological spaces, all the ordinals are Hausdorff and even normal. They are also totally disconnected (connected components are points), scattered (every non-empty subspace has an isolated point; in this case, just take the smallest element), zero-dimensional (the topology has a clopen basis: here, write an open interval (β,γ) as the union of the clopen intervals (β,γ'+1) = [β+1,γ'] for γ'<γ). However, they are not extremally disconnected in general (there are open sets, for example the even numbers from ω, whose closure is not open).

The topological spaces ω_{1} and its successor ω_{1}+1 are frequently used as textbook examples of uncountable topological spaces. For example, in the topological space ω_{1}+1, the element ω_{1} is in the closure of the subset ω_{1} even though no (countably-long) sequence of elements in ω_{1} has the element ω_{1} as its limit: an element in ω_{1} is a countable set; for any sequence of such sets, the union of these sets is the union of countably many countable sets, so still countable; this union is an upper bound of the elements of the sequence, and therefore of the limit of the sequence, if it has one.

The space ω_{1} is first-countable but not second-countable, and ω_{1}+1 has neither of these two properties, despite being compact. It is also worthy of note that any continuous function from ω_{1} to R (the real line) is eventually constant: so the Stone–Čech compactification of ω_{1} is ω_{1}+1, just as its one-point compactification (in sharp contrast to ω, whose Stone–Čech compactification is much larger than ω).

=== Ordinal-indexed sequences ===
If α is a limit ordinal and X is a set, an α-indexed sequence of elements of X merely means a function from α to X. This concept, a transfinite sequence or ordinal-indexed sequence, is a generalization of the concept of a sequence. An ordinary sequence corresponds to the case α = ω.

If X is a topological space, we say that an α-indexed sequence of elements of X converges to a limit x when it converges as a net, in other words, when given any neighborhood U of x there is an ordinal β < α such that x_{ι} is in U for all ι ≥ β.

Ordinal-indexed sequences are more powerful than ordinary (ω-indexed) sequences to determine limits in topology: for example, ω_{1} is a limit point of ω_{1}+1 (because it is a limit ordinal), and, indeed, it is the limit of the ω_{1}-indexed sequence which maps any ordinal less than ω_{1} to itself: however, it is not the limit of any ordinary (ω-indexed) sequence in ω_{1}, since any such limit is less than or equal to the union of its elements, which is a countable union of countable sets, hence itself countable.

However, ordinal-indexed sequences are not powerful enough to replace nets (or filters) in general: for example, on the Tychonoff plank (the product space $(\omega_1+1)\times(\omega+1)$), the corner point $(\omega_1,\omega)$ is a limit point (it is in the closure) of the open subset $\omega_1\times\omega$, but it is not the limit of an ordinal-indexed sequence of ordinals in $\omega_1\times\omega$.

== See also ==
- List of topologies
- Lower limit topology
- Long line (topology)
- Linear continuum
- Order topology (functional analysis)
- Partially ordered space
