= Cantor tree =

Infinite binary tree

In mathematical set theory, the Cantor tree is either the full binary tree of height ω + 1, or a topological space related to this by joining its points with intervals.

It was introduced by Robert Lee Moore in the late 1920s as an example of a non-metrizable Moore space (Jones 1966).
