= Locally compact space =

Type of topological space in mathematics

In topology and related branches of mathematics, a topological space is called locally compact if, roughly speaking, each small portion of the space looks like a small portion of a compact space. More precisely, it is a topological space in which every point has a compact neighborhood.

When locally compact spaces are Hausdorff they are called locally compact Hausdorff, which are of particular interest in mathematical analysis.

== Formal definition ==
Let X be a topological space. Most commonly X is called locally compact if every point x of X has a compact neighbourhood, i.e., there exists an open set U and a compact set K, such that $x\in U\subseteq K$.

There are other common definitions, which are all equivalent if X is a Hausdorff space (or preregular), but are not equivalent in general:

1. every point of X has a compact neighbourhood.
2. every point of X has a closed compact neighbourhood.
2′. every point of X has a relatively compact neighbourhood.
2″. every point of X has a local base of relatively compact neighbourhoods.
3. every point of X has a local base of compact neighbourhoods.
4. every point of X has a local base of closed compact neighbourhoods.
5. X is Hausdorff and satisfies any (or equivalently, all) of the previous conditions.

Logical relations among the conditions:

- Each condition implies (1).
- Conditions (2), (2′), (2″) are equivalent.
- Neither of conditions (2), (3) implies the other.
- Condition (4) implies (2) and (3).
- Compactness implies conditions (1) and (2), but not (3) or (4).

Condition (1) is probably the most commonly used definition, since it is the least restrictive and the others are equivalent to it when X is Hausdorff. This equivalence is a consequence of the facts that compact subsets of Hausdorff spaces are closed, and closed subsets of compact spaces are compact. Spaces satisfying (1) are also called weakly locally compact, as they satisfy the weakest of the conditions here.

As they are defined in terms of relatively compact sets, spaces satisfying (2), (2'), (2") can more specifically be called locally relatively compact. Steen & Seebach calls (2), (2'), (2") strongly locally compact to contrast with property (1), which they call locally compact.

Spaces satisfying condition (4) are exactly the locally compact regular spaces. Indeed, such a space is regular, as every point has a local base of closed neighbourhoods. Conversely, in a regular locally compact space suppose a point $x$ has a compact neighbourhood $K$. By regularity, given an arbitrary neighbourhood $U$ of $x$, there is a closed neighbourhood $V$ of $x$ contained in $K\cap U$ and $V$ is compact as a closed set in a compact set.

Condition (5) is used, for example, in Bourbaki. Any space that is locally compact (in the sense of condition (1)) and also Hausdorff automatically satisfies all the conditions above. Since in most applications locally compact spaces are also Hausdorff, these locally compact Hausdorff spaces will thus be the spaces that this article is primarily concerned with.

== Examples and counterexamples ==
=== Compact Hausdorff spaces ===
Every compact Hausdorff space is also locally compact, and many examples of compact spaces may be found in the article compact space. Here we mention only:

- the unit interval [0,1];
- the Cantor set;
- the Hilbert cube.

=== Locally compact Hausdorff spaces that are not compact ===
- The Euclidean spaces R^{n} (and in particular the real line R) are locally compact as a consequence of the Heine–Borel theorem.
- Topological manifolds share the local properties of Euclidean spaces and are therefore also all locally compact. This even includes nonparacompact manifolds such as the long line.
- All discrete spaces are locally compact and Hausdorff (they are just the zero-dimensional manifolds). These are compact only if they are finite.
- All open or closed subsets of a locally compact Hausdorff space are locally compact in the subspace topology. This provides several examples of locally compact subsets of Euclidean spaces, such as the unit disc (either the open or closed version).
- The space Q_{p} of p-adic numbers is locally compact, because it is homeomorphic to the Cantor set minus one point. Thus locally compact spaces are as useful in p-adic analysis as in classical analysis.

=== Hausdorff spaces that are not locally compact ===
As mentioned in the following section, if a Hausdorff space is locally compact, then it is also a Tychonoff space. For this reason, examples of Hausdorff spaces that fail to be locally compact because they are not Tychonoff spaces can be found in the article dedicated to Tychonoff spaces. But there are also examples of Tychonoff spaces that fail to be locally compact, such as:

- the space Q of rational numbers (endowed with the topology from R), since any neighborhood contains a Cauchy sequence corresponding to an irrational number, which has no convergent subsequence in Q;
- the subspace $\{(0, 0)\} \cup ((0, \infty) \times \mathbf{R})$ of $\mathbf{R}^2$, since the origin does not have a compact neighborhood;
- the lower limit topology or upper limit topology on the set R of real numbers (useful in the study of one-sided limits);
- any T_{0}, hence Hausdorff, topological vector space over $\mathbb R$ or $\mathbb C$ that is infinite-dimensional, such as an infinite-dimensional Hilbert space.

The first two examples show that a subset of a locally compact space need not be locally compact, which contrasts with the open and closed subsets in the previous section. The last example contrasts with the Euclidean spaces in the previous section; to be more specific, a Hausdorff topological vector space is locally compact if and only if it is finite-dimensional (in which case it is a Euclidean space). This example also contrasts with the Hilbert cube as an example of a compact space; there is no contradiction because the cube cannot be a neighbourhood of any point in Hilbert space.

=== Non-Hausdorff examples ===
- The one-point compactification of the rational numbers Q is compact and therefore locally compact in senses (1) and (2) but it is not locally compact in senses (3) or (4).
- The particular point topology on any infinite set is locally compact in senses (1) and (3) but not in senses (2) or (4), because the closure of any neighborhood is the entire space, which is non-compact.
- The disjoint union of the above two examples is locally compact in sense (1) but not in senses (2), (3) or (4).
- The right order topology on the real line is locally compact in senses (1) and (3) but not in senses (2) or (4), because the closure of any neighborhood is the entire non-compact space.
- The Sierpiński space is locally compact in senses (1), (2) and (3), and compact as well, but it is not Hausdorff or regular (or even preregular) so it is not locally compact in senses (4) or (5). The disjoint union of countably many copies of Sierpiński space is a non-compact space which is still locally compact in senses (1), (2) and (3), but not (4) or (5).
- More generally, the excluded point topology is locally compact in senses (1), (2) and (3), and compact, but not locally compact in senses (4) or (5).
- The cofinite topology on an infinite set is locally compact in senses (1), (2), and (3), and compact as well, but it is not Hausdorff or regular so it is not locally compact in senses (4) or (5).
- The indiscrete topology on a set with at least two elements is locally compact in senses (1), (2), (3), and (4), and compact as well, but it is not Hausdorff so it is not locally compact in sense (5).

=== General classes of examples ===
- Every space with an Alexandrov topology is locally compact in senses (1) and (3).

== Properties ==
Every locally compact preregular space is, in fact, completely regular. It follows that every locally compact Hausdorff space is a Tychonoff space. Since straight regularity is a more familiar condition than either preregularity (which is usually weaker) or complete regularity (which is usually stronger), locally compact preregular spaces are normally referred to in the mathematical literature as locally compact regular spaces. Similarly locally compact Tychonoff spaces are usually just referred to as locally compact Hausdorff spaces.

Every locally compact regular space, in particular every locally compact Hausdorff space, is a Baire space. That is, the conclusion of the Baire category theorem holds: the interior of every countable union of nowhere dense subsets is empty.

A subspace X of a locally compact Hausdorff space Y is locally compact if and only if X is locally closed in Y (that is, X can be written as the set-theoretic difference of two closed subsets of Y). In particular, every closed set and every open set in a locally compact Hausdorff space is locally compact. Also, as a corollary, a dense subspace X of a locally compact Hausdorff space Y is locally compact if and only if X is open in Y. Furthermore, if a subspace X of any Hausdorff space Y is locally compact, then X still must be locally closed in Y, although the converse does not hold in general.

Without the Hausdorff hypothesis, some of these results break down with weaker notions of locally compact. Every closed set in a weakly locally compact space (= condition (1) in the definitions above) is weakly locally compact. But not every open set in a weakly locally compact space is weakly locally compact. For example, the one-point compactification $\Q^*$ of the rational numbers $\Q$ is compact, and hence weakly locally compact. But it contains $\Q$ as an open set which is not weakly locally compact.

Quotient spaces of locally compact Hausdorff spaces are compactly generated. Conversely, every compactly generated Hausdorff space is a quotient of some locally compact Hausdorff space.

For functions defined on a locally compact space, local uniform convergence is the same as compact convergence.

=== The point at infinity ===
This section explores compactifications of locally compact spaces. Every compact space is its own compactification. So to avoid trivialities it is assumed below that the space X is not compact.

Since every locally compact Hausdorff space X is Tychonoff, it can be embedded in a compact Hausdorff space $b(X)$ using the Stone–Čech compactification. But in fact, there is a simpler method available in the locally compact case; the one-point compactification will embed X in a compact Hausdorff space $a(X)$ with just one extra point. (The one-point compactification can be applied to other spaces, but $a(X)$ will be Hausdorff if and only if X is locally compact and Hausdorff.) The locally compact Hausdorff spaces can thus be characterised as the open subsets of compact Hausdorff spaces.

Intuitively, the extra point in $a(X)$ can be thought of as a point at infinity. The point at infinity should be thought of as lying outside every compact subset of X. Many intuitive notions about tendency towards infinity can be formulated in locally compact Hausdorff spaces using this idea. For example, a continuous real or complex valued function f with domain X is said to vanish at infinity if, given any positive number e, there is a compact subset K of X such that $|f(x)| < e$ whenever the point x lies outside of K. This definition makes sense for any topological space X. If X is locally compact and Hausdorff, such functions are precisely those extendable to a continuous function g on its one-point compactification $a(X) = X \cup \{ \infty \}$ where $g(\infty) = 0.$

=== Gelfand representation ===
For a locally compact Hausdorff space X, the set $C_0(X)$ of all continuous complex-valued functions on X that vanish at infinity is a commutative C*-algebra. In fact, every commutative C*-algebra is isomorphic to $C_0(X)$ for some unique (up to homeomorphism) locally compact Hausdorff space X. This is shown using the Gelfand representation.

=== Locally compact groups ===
The notion of local compactness is important in the study of topological groups mainly because every Hausdorff locally compact group G carries natural measures called the Haar measures which allow one to integrate measurable functions defined on G. The Lebesgue measure on the real line $\R$ is a special case of this.

The Pontryagin dual of a topological abelian group A is locally compact if and only if A is locally compact. More precisely, Pontryagin duality defines a self-duality of the category of locally compact abelian groups. The study of locally compact abelian groups is the foundation of harmonic analysis, a field that has since spread to non-abelian locally compact groups.

== See also ==
- Compact group – Topological group with compact topology
- F. Riesz's theorem
- Locally compact field
- Locally compact quantum group
- Locally compact group – Type of topological group in mathematics
- σ-compact space – Type of topological space
- Core-compact space
- Core of a locally compact space
