= Totally disconnected space =

Topological space that is maximally disconnected

In topology and related branches of mathematics, a totally disconnected space is a topological space that has only singletons (and the empty set) as connected subsets. In every topological space, the singletons (and, when it is considered connected, the empty set) are connected; in a totally disconnected space, these are the only connected subsets.

An important example of a totally disconnected space is the Cantor set, which is homeomorphic to the set of p-adic integers. Another example, playing a key role in algebraic number theory, is the field Q_{p} of p-adic numbers.

== Definition ==
A topological space $X$ is totally disconnected if the connected components in $X$ are the one-point sets. Analogously, a topological space $X$ is totally path-disconnected if all path-components in $X$ are the one-point sets.

Another closely related notion is that of a totally separated space, i.e. a space where quasicomponents are singletons. That is, a topological space $X$ is totally separated if for every $x\in X$, the intersection of all clopen neighborhoods of $x$ is the singleton $\{x\}$. Equivalently, for each pair of distinct points $x, y\in X$, there is a pair of disjoint open neighborhoods $U, V$ of $x, y$ such that $X= U\sqcup V$.

Every totally separated space is evidently totally disconnected but the converse is false even for metric spaces. For instance, take $X$ to be the Cantor's teepee, which is the Knaster–Kuratowski fan with the apex removed. Then $X$ is totally disconnected but its quasicomponents are not singletons. For locally compact Hausdorff spaces the two notions (totally disconnected and totally separated) are equivalent.

Confusingly, in the literature totally disconnected spaces are sometimes called hereditarily disconnected, while the terminology totally disconnected is used for totally separated spaces.

== Examples ==
The following are examples of totally disconnected spaces:

- Discrete spaces
- The rational numbers
- The irrational numbers
- The p-adic numbers; more generally, all profinite groups are totally disconnected.
- The Cantor set and the Cantor space
- The Baire space
- The Sorgenfrey line
- Every Hausdorff space of small inductive dimension 0 is totally disconnected
- The Erdős space ℓ^{2}$\, \cap \, \mathbb{Q}^{\omega}$ is a totally disconnected Hausdorff space that does not have small inductive dimension 0.
- Extremally disconnected Hausdorff spaces
- Stone spaces
- The Knaster–Kuratowski fan provides an example of a connected space, such that the removal of a single point produces a totally disconnected space.

== Properties ==
- Subspaces, products, and coproducts of totally disconnected spaces are totally disconnected.
- Totally disconnected spaces are T_{1} spaces, since connected components are closed.
- Continuous images of totally disconnected spaces are not necessarily totally disconnected, in fact, every compact metric space is a continuous image of the Cantor set.
- A locally compact Hausdorff space has small inductive dimension 0 if and only if it is totally disconnected.
- Every totally disconnected compact metric space is homeomorphic to a subset of a countable product of discrete spaces.
- It is in general not true that every open set in a totally disconnected space is also closed.
- It is in general not true that the closure of every open set in a totally disconnected space is open, i.e. not every totally disconnected Hausdorff space is extremally disconnected.

== Constructing a totally disconnected quotient space of any given space ==
Let $X$ be an arbitrary topological space. Let $x\sim y$ if and only if $y\in \mathrm{conn}(x)$ (where $\mathrm{conn}(x)$ denotes the largest connected subset containing $x$). This is obviously an equivalence relation whose equivalence classes are the connected components of $X$. Endow $X/{\sim}$ with the quotient topology, i.e. the finest topology making the map $m:x\mapsto \mathrm{conn}(x)$ continuous. With a little bit of effort we can see that $X/{\sim}$ is totally disconnected.

In fact this space is not only some totally disconnected quotient but in a certain sense the biggest: The following universal property holds: For any totally disconnected space $Y$ and any continuous map $f : X\rightarrow Y$, there exists a unique continuous map $\breve{f}:(X/\sim)\rightarrow Y$ with $f=\breve{f}\circ m$.

== See also ==
- Extremally disconnected space
- Totally disconnected group
