= Unit interval =

Closed interval [0,1] on the real number line

The unit interval as a subset of the real line

In mathematics, the unit interval is the closed interval [0,1], that is, the set of all real numbers that are greater than or equal to 0 and less than or equal to 1. It is often denoted I (capital letter I). In addition to its role in real analysis, the unit interval is used to study homotopy theory in the field of topology.

In the literature, the term "unit interval" is sometimes applied to the other shapes that an interval from 0 to 1 could take: (0,1], [0,1), and (0,1). However, the notation I is most commonly reserved for the closed interval [0,1].

== Properties ==
The unit interval is a complete metric space, homeomorphic to the extended real number line. As a topological space, it is compact, contractible, path connected and locally path connected. The Hilbert cube is obtained by taking a topological product of countably many copies of the unit interval.

In mathematical analysis, the unit interval is a one-dimensional analytical manifold whose boundary consists of the two points 0 and 1. Its standard orientation goes from 0 to 1.

The unit interval is a totally ordered set and a complete lattice (every subset of the unit interval has a supremum and an infimum).

=== Cardinality ===
The size or cardinality of a set is the number of elements it contains.

The unit interval is a subset of the real numbers $\mathbb{R}$. However, it has the same size as the whole set: the cardinality of the continuum. Since the real numbers can be used to represent points along an infinitely long line, this implies that a line segment of length 1, which is a part of that line, has the same number of points as the whole line. Moreover, it has the same number of points as a square of area 1, as a cube of volume 1, and even as an unbounded n-dimensional Euclidean space $\mathbb{R}^n$ (see Space filling curve).

The number of elements (either real numbers or points) in all the above-mentioned sets is uncountable, as it is strictly greater than the number of natural numbers.

=== Orientation ===
The unit interval is a curve. The open interval (0,1) is a subset of the positive real numbers and inherits an orientation from them. The orientation is reversed when the interval is entered from 1, such as in the integral $\int_1^x \frac{dt}{t}$ used to define natural logarithm for x in the interval, thus yielding negative values for logarithm of such x. In fact, this integral is evaluated as a signed area yielding negative area over the unit interval due to reversed orientation there.

== Generalizations ==
The interval [-1,1], with length two, demarcated by the positive and negative units, occurs frequently, such as in the range of the trigonometric functions sine and cosine and the hyperbolic function tanh. This interval may be used for the domain of inverse functions. For instance, when 𝜃 is restricted to [−π/2, π/2] then $\sin\theta$ is in this interval and arcsine is defined there.

Sometimes, the term "unit interval" is used to refer to objects that play a role in various branches of mathematics analogous to the role that [0,1] plays in homotopy theory. For example, in the theory of quivers, the (analogue of the) unit interval is the graph whose vertex set is $\{0,1\}$ and which contains a single edge e whose source is 0 and whose target is 1. One can then define a notion of homotopy between quiver homomorphisms analogous to the notion of homotopy between continuous maps.

== Fuzzy logic ==
In logic, the unit interval [0,1] can be interpreted as a generalization of the Boolean domain {0,1}, in which case rather than only taking values 0 or 1, any value between and including 0 and 1 can be assumed. Algebraically, negation (NOT) is replaced with 1 − x; conjunction (AND) is replaced with multiplication (xy); and disjunction (OR) is defined, per De Morgan's laws, as 1 − (1 − x)(1 − y).

Interpreting these values as logical truth values yields a multi-valued logic, which forms the basis for fuzzy logic and probabilistic logic. In these interpretations, a value is interpreted as the "degree" of truth – to what extent a proposition is true, or the probability that the proposition is true.

== See also ==
- Interval notation
- Unit square, cube, circle, hyperbola and sphere
- Unit impulse
- Unit vector
