= Neighbourhood system =

Concept in mathematics

In topology and related areas of mathematics, the neighbourhood system, complete system of neighbourhoods, or neighbourhood filter $\mathcal{N}(x)$ for a point $x$ in a topological space is the collection of all neighbourhoods of $x.$

== Definitions ==
Neighbourhood of a point or set

An open neighbourhood of a point (or subset (Note: Usually, "neighbourhood" refers to a neighbourhood of a point and it will be clearly indicated if it instead refers to a neighborhood of a set. So for instance, a statement such as "a neighbourhood in $X$" that does not refer to any particular point or set should, unless somehow indicated otherwise, be taken to mean "a neighbourhood of some point in $X.$")) $x$ in a topological space $X$ is any open subset $U$ of $X$ that contains $x.$ A neighbourhood of $x$ in $X$ is any subset $N \subseteq X$ that contains some open neighbourhood of $x$; explicitly, $N$ is a neighbourhood of $x$ in $X$ if and only if there exists some open subset $U$ with $x \in U \subseteq N$. Equivalently, a neighborhood of $x$ is any set that contains $x$ in its topological interior.

Importantly, a "neighbourhood" does not have to be an open set; those neighbourhoods that also happen to be open sets are known as "open neighbourhoods." (Note: Most authors do not require that neighborhoods be open sets because writing "open" in front of "neighborhood" when this property is needed is not overly onerous and because requiring that they always be open would also greatly limit the usefulness of terms such as "closed neighborhood" and "compact neighborhood".) Similarly, a neighbourhood that is also a closed (respectively, compact, connected, etc.) set is called a closed neighbourhood (respectively, compact neighbourhood, connected neighbourhood, etc.). There are many other types of neighbourhoods that are used in topology and related fields like functional analysis. The family of all neighbourhoods having a certain "useful" property often forms a neighbourhood basis, although many times, these neighbourhoods are not necessarily open. Locally compact spaces, for example, are those spaces that, at every point, have a neighbourhood basis consisting entirely of compact sets.

Neighbourhood filter

The neighbourhood system for a point (or non-empty subset) $x$ is a filter called the neighbourhood filter for $x.$ The neighbourhood filter for a point $x \in X$ is the same as the neighbourhood filter of the singleton set $\{x\}.$

=== Neighbourhood basis ===
A neighbourhood basis or local basis (or neighbourhood base or local base) for a point $x$ is a filter base of the neighbourhood filter; this means that it is a subset
$$\mathcal{B} \subseteq \mathcal{N}(x)$$
such that for all $V \in \mathcal{N}(x),$ there exists some $B \in \mathcal{B}$ such that $B \subseteq V.$ Here, $\mathcal{N}(x)$ denotes the set of all neighbourhoods of $x$. That is, for any neighbourhood $V$ we can find a neighbourhood $B$ in the neighbourhood basis that is contained in $V.$

Equivalently, $\mathcal{B}$ is a local basis at $x$ if and only if the neighbourhood filter $\mathcal{N}$ can be recovered from $\mathcal{B}$ in the sense that the following equality holds:
$$\mathcal{N}(x) = \left\{ V \subseteq X ~:~ B \subseteq V \text{ for some } B \in \mathcal{B} \right\}\!\!\;.$$
A family $\mathcal{B} \subseteq \mathcal{N}(x)$ is a neighbourhood basis for $x$ if and only if $\mathcal{B}$ is a cofinal subset of $\left(\mathcal{N}(x), \supseteq\right)$ with respect to the partial order $\supseteq$ (importantly, this partial order is the superset relation and not the subset relation).

=== Neighbourhood subbasis ===
A neighbourhood subbasis at $x$ is a family $\mathcal{S}$ of subsets of $X,$ each of which contains $x,$ such that the collection of all possible finite intersections of elements of $\mathcal{S}$ forms a neighbourhood basis at $x.$

== Examples ==
If $\R$ has its usual Euclidean topology then the neighborhoods of $0$ are all those subsets $N \subseteq \R$ for which there exists some real number $r > 0$ such that $(-r, r) \subseteq N.$ For example, all of the following sets are neighborhoods of $0$ in $\R$:
$$(-2, 2), \; [-2,2], \; [-2, \infty), \; [-2, 2) \cup \{10\}, \; [-2, 2] \cup \Q, \; \R$$
but none of the following sets are neighborhoods of $0$:
$$\{0\}, \; \Q, \; (0,2), \; [0, 2), \; [0, 2) \cup \Q, \; (-2, 2) \setminus \left\{1, \tfrac{1}{2}, \tfrac{1}{3}, \tfrac{1}{4}, \ldots\right\}$$
where $\Q$ denotes the rational numbers.

If $U$ is an open subset of a topological space $X$ then for every $u \in U,$ $U$ is a neighborhood of $u$ in $X.$ More generally, if $N \subseteq X$ is any set and $\operatorname{int}_X N$ denotes the topological interior of $N$ in $X,$ then $N$ is a neighborhood (in $X$) of every point $x \in \operatorname{int}_X N$ and moreover, $N$ is not a neighborhood of any other point. Said differently, $N$ is a neighborhood of a point $x \in X$ if and only if $x \in \operatorname{int}_X N.$

Neighbourhood bases

In any topological space, the neighbourhood system for a point is also a neighbourhood basis for the point. The set of all open neighbourhoods at a point forms a neighbourhood basis at that point. For any point $x$ in a metric space, the sequence of open balls around $x$ with radius $1/n$ form a countable neighbourhood basis $\mathcal{B} = \left\{B_{1/n} : n = 1,2,3,\dots \right\}$. This means every metric space is first-countable.

Given a space $X$ with the indiscrete topology the neighbourhood system for any point $x$ only contains the whole space, $\mathcal{N}(x) = \{X\}$.

In the weak topology on the space of measures on a space $E,$ a neighbourhood base about $\nu$ is given by
$$\left\{\mu \in \mathcal{M}(E) : \left|\mu f_i - \nu f_i\right| < r_i, \, i = 1,\dots,n\right\}$$
where $f_i$ are continuous bounded functions from $E$ to the real numbers and $r_1, \dots, r_n$ are positive real numbers.

Seminormed spaces and topological groups

In a seminormed space, that is a vector space with the topology induced by a seminorm, all neighbourhood systems can be constructed by translation of the neighbourhood system for the origin,
$$\mathcal{N}(x) = \mathcal{N}(0) + x.$$

This is because, by assumption, vector addition is separately continuous in the induced topology. Therefore, the topology is determined by its neighbourhood system at the origin. More generally, this remains true whenever the space is a topological group or the topology is defined by a pseudometric.

== Properties ==
Suppose $u \in U \subseteq X$ and let $\mathcal{N}$ be a neighbourhood basis for $u$ in $X.$ Make $\mathcal{N}$ into a directed set by partially ordering it by superset inclusion $\,\supseteq.$ Then $U$ is not a neighborhood of $u$ in $X$ if and only if there exists an $\mathcal{N}$-indexed net $\left(x_N\right)_{N \in \mathcal{N}}$ in $X \setminus U$ such that $x_N \in N \setminus U$ for every $N \in \mathcal{N}$ (which implies that $\left(x_N\right)_{N \in \mathcal{N}} \to u$ in $X$).

== See also ==
- Base (topology) – Collection of open sets used to define a topology
- Filter on a set – Family of subsets representing "large" sets
- Filters in topology – Use of filters to describe and characterize all basic topological notions and results
- Locally convex topological vector space – Space with topology generated by convex sets
- Neighbourhood (mathematics) – Open set containing a given point
- Subbase – Collection of subsets that generate a topology
- Tubular neighborhood – Neighborhood of a submanifold

== Bibliography ==
- Bourbaki, Nicolas (1989) [1966]. General Topology: Chapters 1–4 [Topologie Générale]. Éléments de mathématique. Berlin New York: Springer Science & Business Media. ISBN 978-3-540-64241-1. OCLC 18588129.
- Dixmier, Jacques (1984). General Topology. Undergraduate Texts in Mathematics. Translated by Berberian, S. K. New York: Springer-Verlag. ISBN 978-0-387-90972-1. OCLC 10277303.
- Willard, Stephen (2004) [1970]. General Topology. Mineola, N.Y.: Dover Publications. ISBN 978-0-486-43479-7. OCLC 115240.
