= Base (topology) =

Collection of open sets used to define a topology

In mathematics, a base (or basis; pl.: bases) for the topology $\tau$ of a topological space $(X, \tau)$ is a family $\mathcal{B}$ of open subsets of $X$ such that every open set of the topology is equal to the union of some sub-family of $\mathcal{B}$. For example, the set of all open intervals in the real number line $\R$ is a basis for the Euclidean topology on $\R$ because every open interval is an open set, and also every open subset of $\R$ can be written as a union of some family of open intervals.

Bases are ubiquitous throughout topology. The sets in a base for a topology, which are called basic open sets, are often easier to describe and use than arbitrary open sets. Many important topological definitions such as continuity and convergence can be checked using only basic open sets instead of arbitrary open sets. Some topologies have a base of open sets with specific useful properties that may make checking such topological definitions easier.

Not all families of subsets of a set $X$ form a base for a topology on $X$. Under some conditions detailed below, a family of subsets will form a base for a (unique) topology on $X$, obtained by taking all possible unions of subfamilies. Such families of sets are very frequently used to define topologies. A weaker notion related to bases is that of a subbase for a topology. Bases for topologies are also closely related to neighborhood bases.

== Definition and basic properties ==
Given a topological space $(X,\tau)$, a base (or basis) for the topology $\tau$ (also called a base for $X$ if the topology is understood) is a family $\mathcal{B}\subseteq\tau$ of open sets such that every open set of the topology can be represented as the union of some subfamily of $\mathcal{B}$. (Note: The empty set, which is always open, is the union of the empty family.) The elements of $\mathcal{B}$ are called basic open sets. Equivalently, a family $\mathcal{B}$ of subsets of $X$ is a base for the topology $\tau$ if and only if $\mathcal{B}\subseteq\tau$ and for every open set $U$ in $X$ and point $x\in U$ there is some basic open set $B\in\mathcal{B}$ such that $x\in B\subseteq U$.

For example, the collection of all open intervals in the real line forms a base for the standard topology on the real numbers. More generally, in a metric space $M$ the collection of all open balls about points of $M$ forms a base for the topology.

In general, a topological space $(X,\tau)$ can have many bases. The whole topology $\tau$ is always a base for itself (that is, $\tau$ is a base for $\tau$). For the real line, the collection of all open intervals is a base for the topology. So is the collection of all open intervals with rational endpoints, or the collection of all open intervals with irrational endpoints, for example. Note that two different bases need not have any basic open set in common. One of the topological properties of a space $X$ is the minimum cardinality of a base for its topology, called the weight of $X$ and denoted $w(X)$. From the examples above, the real line has countable weight.

If $\mathcal{B}$ is a base for the topology $\tau$ of a space $X$, it satisfies the following properties:

(B1) The elements of $\mathcal{B}$ cover $X$, i.e., every point $x\in X$ belongs to some element of $\mathcal{B}$.
(B2) For every $B_1,B_2\in\mathcal{B}$ and every point $x\in B_1\cap B_2$, there exists some $B_3\in\mathcal{B}$ such that $x\in B_3\subseteq B_1\cap B_2$.

Property (B1) corresponds to the fact that $X$ is an open set; property (B2) corresponds to the fact that $B_1\cap B_2$ is an open set.

Conversely, suppose $X$ is just a set without any topology and $\mathcal{B}$ is a family of subsets of $X$ satisfying properties (B1) and (B2). Then $\mathcal{B}$ is a base for the topology that it generates. More precisely, let $\tau$ be the family of all subsets of $X$ that are unions of subfamilies of $\mathcal{B}.$ Then $\tau$ is a topology on $X$ and $\mathcal{B}$ is a base for $\tau$. (Sketch: $\tau$ defines a topology because it is stable under arbitrary unions by construction, it is stable under finite intersections by (B2), it contains $X$ by (B1), and it contains the empty set as the union of the empty subfamily of $\mathcal{B}$. The family $\mathcal{B}$ is then a base for $\tau$ by construction.) Such families of sets are a very common way of defining a topology.

In general, if $X$ is a set and $\mathcal{B}$ is an arbitrary collection of subsets of $X$, there is a (unique) smallest topology $\tau$ on $X$ containing $\mathcal{B}$. (This topology is the intersection of all topologies on $X$ containing $\mathcal{B}$.) The topology $\tau$ is called the topology generated by $\mathcal{B}$, and $\mathcal{B}$ is called a subbase for $\tau$. The topology $\tau$ consists of $X$ together with all arbitrary unions of finite intersections of elements of $\mathcal{B}$ (see the article about subbase.) Now, if $\mathcal{B}$ also satisfies properties (B1) and (B2), the topology generated by $\mathcal{B}$ can be described in a simpler way without having to take intersections: $\tau$ is the set of all unions of elements of $\mathcal{B}$ (and $\mathcal{B}$ is a base for $\tau$ in that case).

There is often an easy way to check condition (B2). If the intersection of any two elements of $\mathcal{B}$ is itself an element of $\mathcal{B}$ or is empty, then condition (B2) is automatically satisfied (by taking $B_3=B_1\cap B_2$). For example, the Euclidean topology on the plane admits as a base the set of all open rectangles with horizontal and vertical sides, and a nonempty intersection of two such basic open sets is also a basic open set. But another base for the same topology is the collection of all open disks; and here the full (B2) condition is necessary.

An example of a collection of open sets that is not a base is the set $S$ of all semi-infinite intervals of the forms $(-\infty,a)$ and $(a,\infty)$ with $a\in\mathbb{R}$. The topology generated by $S$ contains all open intervals $(a,b)=(-\infty,b)\cap(a,\infty)$, hence $S$ generates the standard topology on the real line. But $S$ is only a subbase for the topology, not a base: a finite open interval $(a,b)$ does not contain any element of $S$ (equivalently, property (B2) does not hold).

== Examples ==
The set $\Gamma$ of all open intervals in $\mathbb{R}$ forms a basis for the Euclidean topology on $\mathbb{R}$.

A non-empty family of subsets of a set $X$ that is closed under finite intersections of two or more sets, which is called a $\pi$-system on $X$, is necessarily a base for a topology on $X$ if and only if it covers $X$. By definition, every σ-algebra, every filter (and so in particular, every neighborhood filter), and every topology is a covering $\pi$-system and so also a base for a topology. In fact, if $\Gamma$ is a filter on $X$ then $\{\varnothing\}\cup\Gamma$ is a topology on $X$ and $\Gamma$ is a basis for it. A base for a topology does not have to be closed under finite intersections and many are not. But nevertheless, many topologies are defined by bases that are also closed under finite intersections. For example, each of the following families of subset of $\mathbb{R}$ is closed under finite intersections and so each forms a basis for some topology on $\mathbb{R}$:

- The set $\Gamma$ of all bounded open intervals in $\mathbb{R}$ generates the usual Euclidean topology on $\mathbb{R}$.
- The set $\Sigma$ of all bounded closed intervals in $\mathbb{R}$ generates the discrete topology on $\mathbb{R}$ and so the Euclidean topology is a subset of this topology. This is despite the fact that $\Gamma$ is not a subset of $\Sigma$. Consequently, the topology generated by $\Gamma$, which is the Euclidean topology on $\mathbb{R}$, is coarser than the topology generated by $\Sigma$. In fact, it is strictly coarser because $\Sigma$ contains non-empty compact sets which are never open in the Euclidean topology.
- The set $\Gamma_\Q$ of all intervals in $\Gamma$ such that both endpoints of the interval are rational numbers generates the same topology as $\Gamma$. This remains true if each instance of the symbol $\Gamma$ is replaced by $\Sigma$.
- $\Sigma_\infty = \{[r,\infty): r\in\R\}$ generates a topology that is strictly coarser than the topology generated by $\Sigma$. No element of $\Sigma_\infty$ is open in the Euclidean topology on $\mathbb{R}$.
- $\Gamma_\infty = \{(r,\infty): r\in\R\}$ generates a topology that is strictly coarser than both the Euclidean topology and the topology generated by $\Sigma_\infty$. The sets $\Sigma_\infty$ and $\Gamma_\infty$ are disjoint, but nevertheless $\Gamma_\infty$ is a subset of the topology generated by $\Sigma_\infty$.

=== Objects defined in terms of bases ===
- The order topology on a totally ordered set admits a collection of open-interval-like sets as a base.
- In a metric space the collection of all open balls forms a base for the topology.
- The discrete topology has the collection of all singletons as a base.
- A second-countable space is one that has a countable base.

The Zariski topology on the spectrum of a ring has a base consisting of open sets that have specific useful properties. For the usual base for this topology, every finite intersection of basic open sets is a basic open set.

- The Zariski topology of $\C^n$ is the topology that has the algebraic sets as closed sets. It has a base formed by the set complements of algebraic hypersurfaces.
- The Zariski topology of the spectrum of a ring (the set of the prime ideals) has a base such that each element consists of all prime ideals that do not contain a given element of the ring.

== Theorems ==
- A topology $\tau_2$ is finer than a topology $\tau_1$ if and only if for each $x\in X$ and each basic open set $B$ of $\tau_1$ containing $x$, there is a basic open set of $\tau_2$ containing $x$ and contained in $B$.
- If $\mathcal{B}_1, \ldots, \mathcal{B}_n$ are bases for the topologies $\tau_1, \ldots, \tau_n$ then the collection of all set products $B_1 \times \cdots \times B_n$ with each $B_i\in\mathcal{B}_i$ is a base for the product topology $\tau_1 \times \cdots \times \tau_n.$ In the case of an infinite product, this still applies, except that all but finitely many of the base elements must be the entire space.
- Let $\mathcal{B}$ be a base for $X$ and let $Y$ be a subspace of $X$. Then if we intersect each element of $\mathcal{B}$ with $Y$, the resulting collection of sets is a base for the subspace $Y$.
- If a function $f : X \to Y$ maps every basic open set of $X$ into an open set of $Y$, it is an open map. Similarly, if every preimage of a basic open set of $Y$ is open in $X$, then $f$ is continuous.
- $\mathcal{B}$ is a base for a topological space $X$ if and only if the subcollection of elements of $\mathcal{B}$ which contain $x$ form a local base at $x$, for any point $x\in X$.

== Base for the closed sets ==
Closed sets are equally adept at describing the topology of a space. There is, therefore, a dual notion of a base for the closed sets of a topological space. Given a topological space $X,$ a family $\mathcal{C}$ of closed sets forms a base for the closed sets if and only if for each closed set $A$ and each point $x$ not in $A$ there exists an element of $\mathcal{C}$ containing $A$ but not containing $x.$ A family $\mathcal{C}$ is a base for the closed sets of $X$ if and only if its dual in $X,$ that is the family $\{X\setminus C: C\in \mathcal{C}\}$ of complements of members of $\mathcal{C}$, is a base for the open sets of $X.$

Let $\mathcal{C}$ be a base for the closed sets of $X.$ Then

1. $\bigcap \mathcal{C} = \varnothing$
2. For each $C_1, C_2 \in \mathcal{C}$ the union $C_1 \cup C_2$ is the intersection of some subfamily of $\mathcal{C}$ (that is, for any $x \in X$ not in $C_1 \text{ or } C_2$ there is some $C_3 \in \mathcal{C}$ containing $C_1 \cup C_2$ and not containing $x$).

Any collection of subsets of a set $X$ satisfying these properties forms a base for the closed sets of a topology on $X.$ The closed sets of this topology are precisely the intersections of members of $\mathcal{C}.$

In some cases it is more convenient to use a base for the closed sets rather than the open ones. For example, a space is completely regular if and only if the zero sets form a base for the closed sets. Given any topological space $X,$ the zero sets form the base for the closed sets of some topology on $X.$ This topology will be the finest completely regular topology on $X$ coarser than the original one. In a similar vein, the Zariski topology on $A^n$ is defined by taking the zero sets of polynomial functions as a base for the closed sets.

== Weight and character ==
We shall work with notions established in (Engelking 1989, p. 12, pp. 127-128).

Fix $X$ a topological space. Here, a network is a family $\mathcal{N}$ of sets, for which, for all points $x$ and open neighbourhoods U containing $x$, there exists $B$ in $\mathcal{N}$ for which $x \in B \subseteq U.$ Note that, unlike a basis, the sets in a network need not be open.

We define the weight, $w(X)$, as the minimum cardinality of a basis; we define the network weight, $nw(X)$, as the minimum cardinality of a network; the character of a point, $\chi(x,X),$ as the minimum cardinality of a neighbourhood basis for $x$ in $X$; and the character of $X$ to be
$$\chi(X)\triangleq\sup\{\chi(x,X):x\in X\}.$$

The point of computing the character and weight is to be able to tell what sort of bases and local bases can exist. We have the following facts:

- $nw(X) \leq w(X)$.
- if $X$ is discrete, then $w(X) = nw(X) = |X|$.
- if $X$ is Hausdorff, then $nw(X)$ is finite if and only if $X$ is finite discrete.
- if $B$ is a basis of $X$ then there is a basis $B'\subseteq B$ of size $|B'|\leq w(X).$
- if $N$ is a neighbourhood basis for $x$ in $X$ then there is a neighbourhood basis $N'\subseteq N$ of size $|N'|\leq \chi(x,X).$
- if $f : X \to Y$ is a continuous surjection, then $nw(Y) \leq w(X)$. (Simply consider the $Y$-network $fB \triangleq \{f(U) : U \in B\}$ for each basis $B$ of $X$.)
- if $(X,\tau)$ is Hausdorff, then there exists a weaker Hausdorff topology $(X,\tau')$ so that $w(X,\tau')\leq nw(X,\tau).$ So a fortiori, if $X$ is also compact, then such topologies coincide and hence we have, combined with the first fact, $nw(X) = w(X)$.
- if $f : X \to Y$ a continuous surjective map from a compact metrizable space to an Hausdorff space, then $Y$ is compact metrizable.

The last fact follows from $f(X)$ being compact Hausdorff, and hence $nw(f(X))=w(f(X))\leq w(X)\leq\aleph_0$ (since compact metrizable spaces are necessarily second countable); as well as the fact that compact Hausdorff spaces are metrizable exactly in case they are second countable. (An application of this, for instance, is that every path in a Hausdorff space is compact metrizable.)

=== Increasing chains of open sets ===
Using the above notation, suppose that $w(X) \leq \kappa$ some infinite cardinal. Then there does not exist a strictly increasing sequence of open sets (equivalently strictly decreasing sequence of closed sets) of length $\leq \kappa^+\!$.

To see this (without the axiom of choice), fix
$$\left \{ U_{\xi} \right \}_{\xi\in\kappa},$$
as a basis of open sets. And suppose per contra, that
$$\left \{ V_{\xi}\right \}_{\xi\in\kappa^{+}}$$
were a strictly increasing sequence of open sets. This means
$$\forall \alpha<\kappa^+\!: \qquad V_{\alpha}\setminus\bigcup_{\xi<\alpha} V_{\xi} \neq \varnothing.$$

For
$$x\in V_{\alpha}\setminus\bigcup_{\xi<\alpha}V_{\xi},$$
we may use the basis to find some $U_\gamma$ with $x$ in $U_\gamma \subseteq V_\alpha$. In this way we may well-define a map, $f : \kappa^+ \!\to \kappa$ mapping each $\alpha$ to the least $\gamma$ for which $U_\gamma \subseteq V_\alpha$ and meets
$$V_{\alpha} \setminus \bigcup_{\xi<\alpha} V_{\xi}.$$

This map is injective, otherwise there would be $\alpha < \beta$ with $f(\alpha) = f(\beta) = \gamma$, which would further imply $U_\gamma \subseteq V_\alpha$ but also meets
$$V_{\beta} \setminus \bigcup_{\xi<\alpha} V_{\xi} \subseteq V_{\beta} \setminus V_{\alpha},$$
which is a contradiction. But this would go to show that $\kappa^+ \!\leq \kappa$, a contradiction.

== See also ==
- Esenin-Volpin's theorem
- Gluing axiom
- Neighbourhood system

== Bibliography ==
- Adams, Colin; Franzosa, Robert (2009). Introduction to Topology: Pure and Applied. New Delhi: Pearson Education. ISBN 978-81-317-2692-1. OCLC 789880519.
- Arkhangel'skii, A.V.; Ponomarev, V.I. (1984). Fundamentals of general topology: problems and exercises. Mathematics and Its Applications. Vol. 13. Translated from the Russian by V. K. Jain. Dordrecht: D. Reidel Publishing. Zbl 0568.54001.
- Bourbaki, Nicolas (1989) [1966]. General Topology: Chapters 1–4 [Topologie Générale]. Éléments de mathématique. Berlin New York: Springer Science & Business Media. doi:10.1007/978-3-642-61701-0. ISBN 978-3-540-64241-1. OCLC 18588129.
- Dugundji, James (1966). Topology. Boston: Allyn and Bacon. ISBN 978-0-697-06889-7. OCLC 395340485.
- Engelking, Ryszard (1989). General topology. Berlin: Heldermann Verlag. ISBN 3-88538-006-4.
- Willard, Stephen (2004) [1970]. General Topology. Mineola, N.Y.: Dover Publications. ISBN 978-0-486-43479-7. OCLC 115240.
