= Discrete space =

Type of topological space

In topology, a discrete space is a particularly simple example of a topological space or similar structure, one in which the points form a discontinuous sequence, meaning they are isolated from each other in a certain sense. The discrete topology is the finest topology that can be given on a set. Every subset is open in the discrete topology so that in particular, every singleton subset is an open set in the discrete topology.

== Definitions ==
Given a set $X$:

- the discrete topology on $X$ is defined by letting every subset of $X$ be open (and hence also closed), and $X$ is a discrete topological space if it is equipped with its discrete topology;
- the discrete uniformity on $X$ is defined by letting every superset of the diagonal $\{(x,x) : x \in X\}$ in $X \times X$ be an entourage, and $X$ is a discrete uniform space if it is equipped with its discrete uniformity.
- the discrete metric $\rho$ on $X$ is defined by
  $$\rho(x,y) = \begin{cases}
0 &\text{if}\ x = y, \\
1 &\text{if}\ x\neq y
\end{cases}$$
  for any $x,y \in X.$ In this case $(X,\rho)$ is called a discrete metric space or a space of isolated points.
- a discrete subspace of some given topological space $(Y, \tau)$ refers to a topological subspace of $(Y, \tau)$ (a subset of $Y$ together with the subspace topology that $(Y, \tau)$ induces on it) whose topology is equal to the discrete topology. For example, if $Y := \R$ has its usual Euclidean topology then $S = \bigl\{\tfrac{1}{2}, \tfrac{1}{3}, \tfrac{1}{4}, \ldots\bigr\}$ (endowed with the subspace topology) is a discrete subspace of $\R$ but $S \cup \{0\}$ is not.
- a set $S$ is discrete in a metric space $(X,d),$ for $S \subseteq X,$ if for every $x \in S,$ there exists some $\delta > 0$ (depending on $x$) such that $d(x,y) > \delta$ for all $y \in S\setminus\{x\}$; such a set consists of isolated points. A set $S$ is uniformly discrete in the metric space $(X,d),$ for $S \subseteq X,$ if there exists $\varepsilon > 0$ such that for any two distinct $x, y \in S, d(x, y) > \varepsilon.$

A metric space $(E,d)$ is said to be uniformly discrete if there exists a packing radius $r > 0$ such that, for any $x,y \in E,$ one has either $x = y$ or $d(x,y) > r.$ The topology underlying a metric space can be discrete, without the metric being uniformly discrete: for example the usual metric on the set $\left\{2^{-n} : n \in \N_0\right\}.$

Proof that a discrete space is not necessarily uniformly discrete

Let $X = \bigl\{2^{-n} : n \in \N_0 \bigr\} = \bigl\{1, \frac{1}{2}, \frac{1}{4}, \frac{1}{8}, \dots\bigr\},$ consider this set using the usual metric on the real numbers. Then, $X$ is a discrete space, since for each point $x_n = 2^{-n} \in X,$ we can surround it with the open interval $(x_n - \varepsilon, x_n + \varepsilon),$ where $\varepsilon = \tfrac{1}{2} \left(x_n - x_{n+1}\right) = 2^{-(n+2)}.$ The intersection $\left(x_n - \varepsilon, x_n + \varepsilon\right) \cap X$ is therefore trivially the singleton $\{x_n\}.$ Since the intersection of an open set of the real numbers and $X$ is open for the induced topology, it follows that $\{x_n\}$ is open so singletons are open and $X$ is a discrete space.

However, $X$ cannot be uniformly discrete. To see why, suppose there exists an $r > 0$ such that $d(x,y) > r$ whenever $x \neq y.$ It suffices to show that there are at least two points $x$ and $y$ in $X$ that are closer to each other than $r.$ Since the distance between adjacent points $x_n$ and $x_{n+1}$ is $2^{-(n+1)},$ we need to find an $n$ that satisfies this inequality:
$$\begin{align}
2^{-(n+1)} &< r \\
1 &< 2^{n+1}r \\
r^{-1} &< 2^{n+1} \\
\log_2\left(r^{-1}\right) &< n+1 \\
-\log_2(r) &< n+1 \\
-1 - \log_2(r) &< n
\end{align}$$

Since there is always an $n$ bigger than any given real number, it follows that there will always be at least two points in $X$ that are closer to each other than any positive $r,$ therefore $X$ is not uniformly discrete.

== Properties ==
The underlying uniformity on a discrete metric space is the discrete uniformity, and the underlying topology on a discrete uniform space is the discrete topology. Thus, the different notions of discrete space are compatible with one another. On the other hand, the underlying topology of a non-discrete uniform or metric space can be discrete; an example is the metric space $X = \{n^{-1} : n \in \N\}$ (with metric inherited from the real line and given by $d(x,y) = \left|x - y\right|$). This is not the discrete metric; also, this space is not complete and hence not discrete as a uniform space. Nevertheless, it is discrete as a topological space. We say that $X$ is topologically discrete but not uniformly discrete or metrically discrete.

Additionally:

- The topological dimension of a discrete space is equal to 0.
- A topological space is discrete if and only if its singletons are open, which is the case if and only if it does not contain any accumulation points.
- The singletons form a basis for the discrete topology.
- A uniform space $X$ is discrete if and only if the diagonal $\{(x,x) : x \in X\}$ is an entourage.
- Every discrete topological space satisfies each of the separation axioms; in particular, every discrete space is Hausdorff, that is, separated.
- A discrete space is compact if and only if it is finite.
- Every discrete uniform or metric space is complete.
- Combining the above two facts, every discrete uniform or metric space is totally bounded if and only if it is finite.
- Every discrete metric space is bounded.
- Every discrete space is first-countable; it is moreover second-countable if and only if it is countable.
- Every discrete space is totally disconnected.
- Every non-empty discrete space is second category.
- Any two discrete spaces with the same cardinality are homeomorphic.
- Every discrete space is metrizable (by the discrete metric).
- A finite space is metrizable only if it is discrete.
- If $X$ is a topological space and $Y$ is a set carrying the discrete topology, then $X$ is evenly covered by $X \times Y$ (the projection map is the desired covering)
- The subspace topology on the integers as a subspace of the real line is the discrete topology.
- A discrete space is separable if and only if it is countable.
- Any topological subspace of $\mathbb{R}$ (with its usual Euclidean topology) that is discrete is necessarily countable.

Any function from a discrete topological space to another topological space is continuous, and any function from a discrete uniform space to another uniform space is uniformly continuous. That is, the discrete space $X$ is free on the set $X$ in the category of topological spaces and continuous maps or in the category of uniform spaces and uniformly continuous maps. These facts are examples of a much broader phenomenon, in which discrete structures are usually free on sets.

With metric spaces, things are more complicated, because there are several categories of metric spaces, depending on what is chosen for the morphisms. Certainly the discrete metric space is free when the morphisms are all uniformly continuous maps or all continuous maps, but this says nothing interesting about the metric structure, only the uniform or topological structure. Categories more relevant to the metric structure can be found by limiting the morphisms to Lipschitz continuous maps or to short maps; however, these categories don't have free objects (on more than one element). However, the discrete metric space is free in the category of bounded metric spaces and Lipschitz continuous maps, and it is free in the category of metric spaces bounded by 1 and short maps. That is, any function from a discrete metric space to another bounded metric space is Lipschitz continuous, and any function from a discrete metric space to another metric space bounded by 1 is short.

Going the other direction, a function $f$ from a topological space $Y$ to a discrete space $X$ is continuous if and only if it is locally constant in the sense that every point in $Y$ has a neighborhood on which $f$ is constant.

Every ultrafilter $\mathcal{U}$ on a non-empty set $X$ can be associated with a topology $\tau = \mathcal{U} \cup \left\{ \varnothing \right\}$ on $X$ with the property that every non-empty proper subset $S$ of $X$ is either an open subset or else a closed subset, but never both. Said differently, every subset is open or closed but (in contrast to the discrete topology) the only subsets that are both open and closed (i.e. clopen) are $\varnothing$ and $X$. In comparison, every subset of $X$ is open and closed in the discrete topology.

== Examples and uses ==
A discrete structure is often used as the "default structure" on a set that doesn't carry any other natural topology, uniformity, or metric; discrete structures can often be used as "extreme" examples to test particular suppositions. For example, any group can be considered as a topological group by giving it the discrete topology, implying that theorems about topological groups apply to all groups. Indeed, analysts may refer to the ordinary, non-topological groups studied by algebraists as "discrete groups". In some cases, this can be usefully applied, for example in combination with Pontryagin duality. A 0-dimensional manifold (or differentiable or analytic manifold) is nothing but a discrete and countable topological space (an uncountable discrete space is not second-countable). We can therefore view any discrete countable group as a 0-dimensional Lie group.

A product of countably infinite copies of the discrete space of natural numbers is homeomorphic to the space of irrational numbers, with the homeomorphism given by the continued fraction expansion. A product of countably infinite copies of the discrete space $\{0,1\}$ is homeomorphic to the Cantor set; and in fact uniformly homeomorphic to the Cantor set if we use the product uniformity on the product. Such a homeomorphism is given by using ternary notation of numbers. (See Cantor space.) Every fiber of a locally injective function is necessarily a discrete subspace of its domain.

In the foundations of mathematics, the study of compactness properties of products of $\{0,1\}$ is central to the topological approach to the ultrafilter lemma (equivalently, the Boolean prime ideal theorem), which is a weak form of the axiom of choice.

== Indiscrete spaces ==
In some ways, the opposite of the discrete topology is the trivial topology (also called the indiscrete topology), which has the fewest possible open sets (just the empty set and the space itself). Where the discrete topology is initial or free, the indiscrete topology is final or cofree: every function from a topological space to an indiscrete space is continuous, etc.

== See also ==
- Cylinder set
- Integer lattice
- List of topologies
- Taxicab geometry
