= Second-countable space =

Topological space whose topology has a countable base

In topology, a second-countable space, also called a completely separable space, is a topological space whose topology has a countable base. More explicitly, a topological space $T$ is second-countable if there exists some countable collection $\mathcal{U} = \{U_i\}_{i=1}^{\infty}$ of open subsets of $T$ such that any open subset of $T$ can be written as a union of elements of some subfamily of $\mathcal{U}$. A second-countable space is said to satisfy the second axiom of countability. Like other countability axioms, the property of being second-countable restricts the number of open subsets that a space can have.

Many "well-behaved" spaces in mathematics are second-countable. For example, Euclidean space (R^{n}) with its usual topology is second-countable. Although the usual base of open balls is uncountable, one can restrict this to the collection of all open balls with rational radii and whose centers have rational coordinates. This restricted collection is countable and still forms a basis.

== Properties ==
Second-countability is a stronger notion than first-countability. A space is first-countable if each point has a countable local base. Given a base for a topology and a point x, the set of all basis sets containing x forms a local base at x. Thus, if one has a countable base for a topology then one has a countable local base at every point, and hence every second-countable space is also a first-countable space. However any uncountable discrete space is first-countable but not second-countable.

Second-countability implies certain other topological properties. Specifically, every second-countable space is separable (has a countable dense subset) and Lindelöf (every open cover has a countable subcover). The reverse implications do not hold. For example, the lower limit topology on the real line is first-countable, separable, and Lindelöf, but not second-countable. For metric spaces, however, the properties of being second-countable, separable, and Lindelöf are all equivalent. Therefore, the lower limit topology on the real line is not metrizable.

In second-countable spaces—as in metric spaces—compactness, sequential compactness, and countable compactness are all equivalent properties.

Urysohn's metrization theorem states that every second-countable, Hausdorff regular space is metrizable. It follows that every such space is completely normal as well as paracompact. Second-countability is therefore a rather restrictive property on a topological space, requiring only a separation axiom to imply metrizability.

=== Other properties ===
- A continuous, open image of a second-countable space is second-countable.
- Every subspace of a second-countable space is second-countable.
- Quotients of second-countable spaces need not be second-countable; however, open quotients always are.
- Any countable product of a second-countable space is second-countable, although uncountable products need not be.
- The topology of a second-countable T_{1} space has cardinality less than or equal to c (the cardinality of the continuum).
- Any base for a second-countable space has a countable subfamily which is still a base.
- Every collection of disjoint open sets in a second-countable space is countable.
- A metric space that has every uncountable subset also have a limit point is second-countable.

== Examples ==
- Consider the disjoint countable union $X = [0,1] \cup [2,3] \cup [4,5] \cup \dots \cup [2k, 2k+1] \cup \dotsb$. Define an equivalence relation and a quotient topology by identifying the left ends of the intervals - that is, identify 0 ~ 2 ~ 4 ~ … ~ 2k and so on. X is second-countable, as a countable union of second-countable spaces. However, X/~ is not first-countable at the coset of the identified points and hence also not second-countable.
- The above space is not homeomorphic to the same set of equivalence classes endowed with the obvious metric: i.e. regular Euclidean distance for two points in the same interval, and the sum of the distances to the left hand point for points not in the same interval -- yielding a strictly coarser topology than the above space. It is a separable metric space (consider the set of rational points), and hence is second-countable.
- The long line is not second-countable, but is first-countable.
