= Counterexamples in Topology =

Book by Lynn Steen

- Author: Lynn Arthur Steen; J. Arthur Seebach, Jr.
- Language: English
- Subject: Topological spaces
- Genre: Non-fiction
- Publisher: Springer-Verlag
- Publication date: 1970
- Publication place: United States
- Media type: Hardback, Paperback
- Pages: 244 pp.
- ISBN: 0-486-68735-X
- OCLC: 32311847
- Dewey Decimal: 514/.3 20
- LC Class: QA611.3 .S74 1995

Counterexamples in Topology (1970, 2nd ed. 1978) is a book on mathematics by topologists Lynn Steen and J. Arthur Seebach, Jr.

In the process of working on problems like the metrization problem, topologists (including Steen and Seebach) defined a wide variety of topological properties. It is often useful in the study and understanding of abstracts such as topological spaces to determine that one property does not follow from another. One of the easiest ways of doing this is to find a counterexample which exhibits one property but not the other. In Counterexamples in Topology, Steen and Seebach, together with five students in an undergraduate research project at St. Olaf College, Minnesota in the summer of 1967, canvassed the field of topology for such counterexamples and compiled them in an attempt to simplify the literature.

For instance, an example of a first-countable space which is not second-countable is counterexample #3, the discrete topology on an uncountable set. This particular counterexample shows that second-countability does not follow from first-countability.

Several other "Counterexamples in ..." books and papers have followed, with similar motivations.

== Reviews ==
In her review of the first edition, Mary Ellen Rudin wrote:

In other mathematical fields one restricts one's problem by requiring that the space be Hausdorff or paracompact or metric, and usually one doesn't really care which, so long as the restriction is strong enough to avoid this dense forest of counterexamples. A usable map of the forest is a fine thing...

In his submission to Mathematical Reviews C. Wayne Patty wrote:

...the book is extremely useful, and the general topology student will no doubt find it very valuable. In addition it is very well written.

When the second edition appeared in 1978 its review in Advances in Mathematics treated topology as territory to be explored:

Lebesgue once said that every mathematician should be something of a naturalist. This book, the updated journal of a continuing expedition to the never-never land of general topology, should appeal to the latent naturalist in every mathematician.

== Notation ==
Several of the naming conventions in this book differ from more accepted modern conventions, particularly with respect to the separation axioms. The authors use the terms T_{3}, T_{4}, and T_{5} to refer to regular, normal, and completely normal. They also refer to completely Hausdorff as Urysohn. This was a result of the different historical development of metrization theory and general topology; see History of the separation axioms for more.

The long line in example 45 is what most topologists nowadays would call the 'closed long ray'.

== List of mentioned counterexamples ==
1. Finite discrete topology
2. Countable discrete topology
3. Uncountable discrete topology
4. Indiscrete topology
5. Partition topology
6. Odd–even topology
7. Deleted integer topology
8. Finite particular point topology
9. Countable particular point topology
10. Uncountable particular point topology
11. Sierpiński space, see also particular point topology
12. Closed extension topology
13. Finite excluded point topology
14. Countable excluded point topology
15. Uncountable excluded point topology
16. Open extension topology
17. Either-or topology
18. Finite complement topology on a countable space
19. Finite complement topology on an uncountable space
20. Countable complement topology
21. Double pointed countable complement topology
22. Compact complement topology
23. Countable Fort space
24. Uncountable Fort space
25. Fortissimo space
26. Arens–Fort space
27. Modified Fort space
28. Euclidean topology
29. Cantor set
30. Rational numbers
31. Irrational numbers
32. Special subsets of the real line
33. Special subsets of the plane
34. One point compactification topology
35. One point compactification of the rationals
36. Hilbert space
37. Fréchet space
38. Hilbert cube
39. Order topology
40. Open ordinal space [0,Γ) where Γ<Ω
41. Closed ordinal space [0,Γ] where Γ<Ω
42. Open ordinal space [0,Ω)
43. Closed ordinal space [0,Ω]
44. Uncountable discrete ordinal space
45. Long line
46. Extended long line
47. An altered long line
48. Lexicographic order topology on the unit square
49. Right order topology
50. Right order topology on R
51. Right half-open interval topology
52. Nested interval topology
53. Overlapping interval topology
54. Interlocking interval topology
55. Hjalmar Ekdal topology, whose name was introduced in this book.
56. Prime ideal topology
57. Divisor topology
58. Evenly spaced integer topology
59. The p-adic topology on Z
60. Relatively prime integer topology
61. Prime integer topology
62. Double pointed reals
63. Countable complement extension topology
64. Smirnov's deleted sequence topology
65. Rational sequence topology
66. Indiscrete rational extension of R
67. Indiscrete irrational extension of R
68. Pointed rational extension of R
69. Pointed irrational extension of R
70. Discrete rational extension of R
71. Discrete irrational extension of R
72. Rational extension in the plane
73. Telophase topology
74. Double origin topology
75. Irrational slope topology
76. Deleted diameter topology
77. Deleted radius topology
78. Half-disk topology
79. Irregular lattice topology
80. Arens square
81. Simplified Arens square
82. Niemytzki's tangent disk topology
83. Metrizable tangent disk topology
84. Sorgenfrey's half-open square topology
85. Michael's product topology
86. Tychonoff plank
87. Deleted Tychonoff plank
88. Alexandroff plank
89. Dieudonné plank
90. Tychonoff corkscrew
91. Deleted Tychonoff corkscrew
92. Hewitt's condensed corkscrew
93. Thomas's plank
94. Thomas's corkscrew
95. Weak parallel line topology
96. Strong parallel line topology
97. Concentric circles
98. Appert space
99. Maximal compact topology
100. Minimal Hausdorff topology
101. Alexandroff square
102. Z^{Z}
103. Uncountable products of Z^{+}
104. Baire product metric on R^{ω}
105. I^{I}
106. [0,Ω)×I^{I}
107. Helly space
108. C[0,1]
109. Box product topology on R^{ω}
110. Stone–Čech compactification
111. Stone–Čech compactification of the integers
112. Novak space
113. Strong ultrafilter topology
114. Single ultrafilter topology
115. Nested rectangles
116. Topologist's sine curve
117. Closed topologist's sine curve
118. Extended topologist's sine curve
119. Infinite broom
120. Closed infinite broom
121. Integer broom
122. Nested angles
123. Infinite cage
124. Bernstein's connected sets
125. Gustin's sequence space
126. Roy's lattice space
127. Roy's lattice subspace
128. Cantor's leaky tent
129. Cantor's teepee
130. Pseudo-arc
131. Miller's biconnected set
132. Wheel without its hub
133. Tangora's connected space
134. Bounded metrics
135. Sierpinski's metric space
136. Duncan's space
137. Cauchy completion
138. Hausdorff's metric topology
139. Post Office metric
140. Radial metric
141. Radial interval topology
142. Bing's discrete extension space
143. Michael's closed subspace

== See also ==
- List of examples in general topology

== Bibliography ==
- Steen, Lynn Arthur; Seebach, J. Arthur (1978). Counterexamples in topology. New York, NY: Springer New York. doi:10.1007/978-1-4612-6290-9. ISBN 978-0-387-90312-5.
- Steen, Lynn Arthur; Seebach, J. Arthur (1995) [First published 1978 by Springer-Verlag, New York]. Counterexamples in topology. New York: Dover Publications. ISBN 0-486-68735-X. OCLC 32311847.
- Lynn Arthur Steen and J. Arthur Seebach, Jr., Counterexamples in Topology. Springer-Verlag, New York, 1978. Reprinted by Dover Publications, New York, 1995. ISBN 0-486-68735-X (Dover edition).
