= List of general topology topics =

This is a list of general topology topics.

== Basic concepts ==
- Topological space
- Topological property
- Open set, closed set
  - Clopen set
  - Closure
  - Boundary
  - Interior
  - Density
  - G-delta set, F-sigma set
  - Closeness
  - Neighborhood
- Continuity (topology)
  - Homeomorphism
  - Local homeomorphism
  - Open and closed maps
  - Embedding
  - Germ
- Basis
  - Subbasis
- Open cover
- Locally finite space
- Covering space
- Atlas

== Limits ==
- Limit point
- Net
- Filter
- Ultrafilter

== Topological properties ==
- Baire category theorem
  - Nowhere dense
  - Baire space
  - Banach–Mazur game
  - Meagre set
  - Comeagre set

=== Compactness and countability ===
- Compact space
  - Relatively compact subspace
  - Heine–Borel theorem
  - Tychonoff's theorem
  - Finite intersection property
  - Compactification
  - Measure of non-compactness
- Paracompact space
- Locally compact space
- Compactly generated space
- Axiom of countability
- Sequential space
- First-countable space
- Second-countable space
- Separable space
- Lindelöf space
- Sigma-compact space

=== Connectedness ===
- Connected space
- Simply connected space
- Path connected space

=== Separation axioms ===
- T_{0} space
- T_{1} space
- Hausdorff space
  - Completely Hausdorff space
- Regular space
- Tychonoff space
- Normal space
- Urysohn's lemma
- Tietze extension theorem
- Paracompact
- Separated sets

== Topological constructions ==
- Direct sum and the dual construction product
- Subspace and the dual construction quotient
- Topological tensor product

== Examples ==
- Discrete space
  - Locally constant function
- Trivial topology
- Cofinite topology
- Cocountable topology
- Finer topology
- Product topology
  - Restricted product
- Quotient space
- Unit interval
- Continuum
- Extended real number line
- Long line (topology)
- Sierpinski space
- Cantor set, Cantor space, Cantor cube
- Space-filling curve
- Topologist's sine curve
- Tychonoff plank
- Comb space
- Uniform norm
- Weak topology
- Strong topology
- Hilbert cube
- Lower limit topology
- Sorgenfrey plane
- Real tree
- Compact-open topology
- Zariski topology
- Kuratowski closure axioms
- Unicoherent
- Solenoid (mathematics)

== Uniform spaces ==
- Uniform continuity
- Lipschitz continuity
- Uniform isomorphism
- Uniform property
- Uniformly connected space

== Metric spaces ==
- Metric topology
- Manhattan distance
- Ultrametric space
  - P-adic numbers, p-adic analysis
- Open ball
- Bounded subset
- Pointwise convergence
- Metrization theorems
- Complete space
  - Cauchy sequence
  - Banach fixed-point theorem
- Polish space
- Hausdorff distance
- Intrinsic metric
- Category of metric spaces

== Topology and order theory ==
- Stone duality
  - Stone's representation theorem for Boolean algebras
- Specialization (pre)order
- Sober space
- Spectral space
- Alexandrov topology
- Upper topology
- Scott topology
  - Scott continuity
- Lawson topology

== Descriptive set theory ==
- Polish Space
- Cantor space

== Dimension theory ==
- Inductive dimension
- Lebesgue covering dimension
- Lebesgue's number lemma

== Combinatorial topology ==
- Polytope
- Simplex
- Simplicial complex
- CW complex
- Manifold
- Triangulation
- Barycentric subdivision
- Sperner's lemma
- Simplicial approximation theorem
- Nerve of an open covering

== Foundations of algebraic topology ==
- Simply connected
- Semi-locally simply connected
- Path (topology)
- Homotopy
- Homotopy lifting property
- Pointed space
- Wedge sum
- Smash product
- Cone (topology)
- Adjunction space

== Topology and algebra ==
- Topological algebra
- Topological group
- Topological ring
- Topological vector space
- Topological module
- Topological abelian group
- Properly discontinuous
- Sheaf space

== See also ==
- Topology glossary
- List of topologies
- List of topology topics
- List of geometric topology topics
- List of algebraic topology topics
- Publications in topology
