= Topological property =

Mathematical property of a space

In topology and related areas of mathematics, a topological property or topological invariant is a property of a topological space that is invariant under homeomorphisms. Alternatively, a topological property is a proper class of topological spaces which is closed under homeomorphisms. That is, a property of spaces is a topological property if whenever a space X possesses that property every space homeomorphic to X possesses that property. Informally, a topological property is a property of the space that can be expressed using open sets.

A common problem in topology is to decide whether two topological spaces are homeomorphic or not. To prove that two spaces are not homeomorphic, it is sufficient to find a topological property which is not shared by them.

== Properties of topological properties ==
A property $P$ is:

- Hereditary, if for every topological space $(X, \mathcal{T})$ and subset $S \subseteq X,$ the subspace $\left(S, \mathcal{T}|_S\right)$ has property $P.$
- Weakly hereditary, if for every topological space $(X, \mathcal{T})$ and closed subset $S \subseteq X,$ the subspace $\left(S, \mathcal{T}|_S\right)$ has property $P.$

== Common topological properties ==
=== Cardinal functions ===
- The cardinality $\vert X \vert$ of the space $X$.
- The cardinality $\vert \tau(X)\vert$ of the topology (the set of open subsets) of the space $X$.
- Weight $w(X)$, the least cardinality of a basis of the topology of the space $X$.
- Density $d(X)$, the least cardinality of a subset of $X$ whose closure is $X$.

=== Separation ===
Some of these terms are defined differently in older mathematical literature; see history of the separation axioms.

- T_{0} or Kolmogorov. A space is Kolmogorov if for every pair of distinct points x and y in the space, there is at least either an open set containing x but not y, or an open set containing y but not x.
- T_{1} or Fréchet. A space is Fréchet if for every pair of distinct points x and y in the space, there is an open set containing x but not y. (Compare with T_{0}; here, we are allowed to specify which point will be contained in the open set.) Equivalently, a space is T_{1} if all its singletons are closed. T_{1} spaces are always T_{0}.
- Sober. A space is sober if every irreducible closed set C has a unique generic point p. In other words, if C is not the (possibly nondisjoint) union of two smaller closed non-empty subsets, then there is a p such that the closure of {p} equals C, and p is the only point with this property.
- T_{2} or Hausdorff. A space is Hausdorff if every two distinct points have disjoint neighbourhoods. T_{2} spaces are always T_{1}.
- T_{2½} or Urysohn. A space is Urysohn if every two distinct points have disjoint closed neighbourhoods. T_{2½} spaces are always T_{2}.
- Completely T_{2} or completely Hausdorff. A space is completely T_{2} if every two distinct points are separated by a function. Every completely Hausdorff space is Urysohn.
- Regular. A space is regular if whenever C is a closed set and p is a point not in C, then C and p have disjoint neighbourhoods.
- T_{3} or Regular Hausdorff. A space is regular Hausdorff if it is a regular T_{0} space. (A regular space is Hausdorff if and only if it is T_{0}, so the terminology is consistent.)
- Completely regular. A space is completely regular if whenever C is a closed set and p is a point not in C, then C and {p} are separated by a function.
- T_{3½}, Tychonoff, Completely regular Hausdorff or Completely T_{3}. A Tychonoff space is a completely regular T_{0} space. (A completely regular space is Hausdorff if and only if it is T_{0}, so the terminology is consistent.) Tychonoff spaces are always regular Hausdorff.
- Normal. A space is normal if any two disjoint closed sets have disjoint neighbourhoods. Normal spaces admit partitions of unity.
- T_{4} or Normal Hausdorff. A normal space is Hausdorff if and only if it is T_{1}. Normal Hausdorff spaces are always Tychonoff.
- Completely normal. A space is completely normal if any two separated sets have disjoint neighbourhoods.
- T_{5} or Completely normal Hausdorff. A completely normal space is Hausdorff if and only if it is T_{1}. Completely normal Hausdorff spaces are always normal Hausdorff.
- Perfectly normal. A space is perfectly normal if any two disjoint closed sets are precisely separated by a function. A perfectly normal space must also be completely normal.
- T_{6} or Perfectly normal Hausdorff, or perfectly T_{4}. A space is perfectly normal Hausdorff, if it is both perfectly normal and T_{1}. A perfectly normal Hausdorff space must also be completely normal Hausdorff.
- Discrete space. A space is discrete if all of its points are completely isolated, i.e. if any subset is open.
- Number of isolated points. The number of isolated points of a topological space.

=== Countability conditions ===
- Separable. A space is separable if it has a countable dense subset.
- First-countable. A space is first-countable if every point has a countable local base.
- Second-countable. A space is second-countable if it has a countable base for its topology. Second-countable spaces are always separable, first-countable and Lindelöf.
- Lindelöf. A space is Lindelöf if every open cover has a countable subcover.
- σ-compact. A space is σ-compact if it is the union of countably many compact subspaces.

=== Connectedness ===
- Connected. A space is connected if it is not the union of a pair of disjoint non-empty open sets. Equivalently, a space is connected if the only clopen sets are the empty set and itself.
- Locally connected. A space is locally connected if every point has a local base consisting of connected sets.
- Totally disconnected. A space is totally disconnected if it has no connected subset with more than one point.
- Extremally disconnected. A space is extremally disconnected if every open set has an open closure.
- Path-connected. A space X is path-connected if for every two points x, y in X, there is a path p from x to y, i.e., a continuous map p: [0,1] → X with p(0) = x and p(1) = y. Path-connected spaces are always connected.
- Locally path-connected. A space is locally path-connected if every point has a local base consisting of path-connected sets. A locally path-connected space is connected if and only if it is path-connected.
- Arc-connected. A space X is arc-connected if for every two points x, y in X, there is an arc f from x to y, i.e., an injective continuous map $f \colon [0,1]\to X$ with $p(0) = x$ and $p(1) = y$. Arc-connected spaces are path-connected.
- Simply connected. A space X is simply connected if it is path-connected and every continuous map $f \colon S^1 \to X$ is homotopic to a constant map.
- Locally simply connected. A space X is locally simply connected if every point x in X has a local base of neighborhoods U that is simply connected.
- Semi-locally simply connected. A space X is semi-locally simply connected if every point has a local base of neighborhoods U such that every loop in U is contractible in X. Semi-local simple connectivity, a strictly weaker condition than local simple connectivity, is a necessary condition for the existence of a universal cover.
- Contractible. A space X is contractible if the identity map on X is homotopic to a constant map. Contractible spaces are always simply connected.
- Hyperconnected. A space is hyperconnected if no two non-empty open sets are disjoint. Every hyperconnected space is connected.
- Ultraconnected. A space is ultraconnected if no two non-empty closed sets are disjoint. Every ultraconnected space is path-connected.
- Indiscrete or trivial. A space is indiscrete if the only open sets are the empty set and itself. Such a space is said to have the trivial topology.

=== Compactness ===
- Compact. A space is compact if every open cover has a finite subcover. Some authors call these spaces quasicompact and reserve compact for Hausdorff spaces where every open cover has finite subcover. Compact spaces are always Lindelöf and paracompact. Compact Hausdorff spaces are therefore normal.
- Sequentially compact. A space is sequentially compact if every sequence has a convergent subsequence.
- Countably compact. A space is countably compact if every countable open cover has a finite subcover.
- Pseudocompact. A space is pseudocompact if every continuous real-valued function on the space is bounded.
- σ-compact. A space is σ-compact if it is the union of countably many compact subsets.
- Lindelöf. A space is Lindelöf if every open cover has a countable subcover.
- Paracompact. A space is paracompact if every open cover has an open locally finite refinement. Paracompact Hausdorff spaces are normal.
- Locally compact. A space is locally compact if every point has a local base consisting of compact neighbourhoods. Slightly different definitions are also used. Locally compact Hausdorff spaces are always Tychonoff.
- Ultraconnected compact. In an ultra-connected compact space X every open cover must contain X itself. Non-empty ultra-connected compact spaces have a largest proper open subset called a monolith.

=== Metrizability ===
- Metrizable. A space is metrizable if it is homeomorphic to a metric space. Metrizable spaces are always Hausdorff and paracompact (and hence normal and Tychonoff), and first-countable. Moreover, a topological space $(X,T)$ is said to be metrizable if there exists a metric for $X$ such that the metric topology $T(d)$ is identical with the topology $T.$
- Polish. A space is called Polish if it is metrizable with a separable and complete metric.
- Locally metrizable. A space is locally metrizable if every point has a metrizable neighbourhood.

=== Miscellaneous ===
- Baire space. A space X is a Baire space if it is not meagre in itself. Equivalently, X is a Baire space if the intersection of countably many dense open sets is dense.
- Door space. A topological space is a door space if every subset is open or closed (or both).
- Topological Homogeneity. A space X is (topologically) homogeneous if for every x and y in X there is a homeomorphism $f \colon X \to X$ such that $f(x) = y.$ Intuitively speaking, this means that the space looks the same at every point. All topological groups are homogeneous.
- Finitely generated or Alexandrov. A space X is Alexandrov if arbitrary intersections of open sets in X are open, or equivalently if arbitrary unions of closed sets are closed. These are precisely the finitely generated members of the category of topological spaces and continuous maps.
- Zero-dimensional. A space is zero-dimensional if it has a base of clopen sets. These are precisely the spaces with a small inductive dimension of 0.
- Almost discrete. A space is almost discrete if every open set is closed (hence clopen). The almost discrete spaces are precisely the finitely generated zero-dimensional spaces.
- Boolean. A space is Boolean if it is zero-dimensional, compact and Hausdorff (equivalently, totally disconnected, compact and Hausdorff). These spaces correspond to Boolean algebras via Stone's representation theorem.
- Reidemeister torsion
- $\kappa$-resolvable. A space is said to be κ-resolvable (respectively: almost κ-resolvable) if it contains κ dense sets that are pairwise disjoint (respectively: almost disjoint over the ideal of nowhere dense subsets). If the space is not $\kappa$-resolvable then it is called $\kappa$-irresolvable.
- Maximally resolvable. Space $X$ is maximally resolvable if it is $\Delta(X)$-resolvable, where $\Delta(X) = \min\{|G| : G\neq \varnothing, G\mbox{ is open}\}.$ Number $\Delta(X)$ is called dispersion character of $X.$
- Strongly discrete. Set $D$ is strongly discrete subset of the space $X$ if the points in $D$ may be separated by pairwise disjoint neighborhoods. Space $X$ is said to be strongly discrete if every non-isolated point of $X$ is the accumulation point of some strongly discrete set.

== Non-topological properties ==
There are many examples of properties of metric spaces, etc, which are not topological properties. To show a property $P$ is not topological, it is sufficient to find two homeomorphic topological spaces $X \cong Y$ such that $X$ has $P$, but $Y$ does not have $P$.

For example, the metric space properties of boundedness and completeness are not topological properties. Let $X = \R$ and $Y = (-\tfrac{\pi}{2},\tfrac{\pi}{2})$ be metric spaces with the standard metric. Then, $X \cong Y$ via the homeomorphism $\operatorname{arctan}\colon X \to Y$. However, $X$ is complete but not bounded, while $Y$ is bounded but not complete.

== See also ==
- Characteristic class – Association of cohomology classes to principal bundles
- Characteristic numbers – Association of cohomology classes to principal bundles
- Chern class – Characteristic classes of vector bundles
- Euler characteristic – Topological invariant in mathematics
- Fixed-point property – Mathematical property
- Homology and cohomology
- Homotopy group and Cohomotopy group
- Knot invariant – Function of a knot that takes the same value for equivalent knots
- Linking number – How many times curves wind around each other
- List of topologies – List of concrete topologies and topological spaces
- Quantum invariant – Concept in mathematical knot theory
- Topological quantum number – Physical quantities with discrete values
- Winding number – Number of times a curve wraps around a point in the plane
