= Divisor topology =

In mathematics, more specifically general topology, the divisor topology is a specific topology on the set $X = \{2, 3, 4,...\}$ of positive integers greater than or equal to two. The divisor topology is the poset topology for the partial order relation of divisibility of integers on $X$.

== Construction ==
The sets $S_n = \{x \in X : x\mathop|n \}$ for $n = 2,3,...$ form a basis for the divisor topology on $X$, where the notation $x\mathop|n$ means $x$ is a divisor of $n$.

The open sets in this topology are the lower sets for the partial order defined by $x\leq y$ if $x\mathop|y$. The closed sets are the upper sets for this partial order.

== Properties ==
All the properties below are proved in or follow directly from the definitions.

- The closure of a point $x\in X$ is the set of all multiples of $x$.
- Given a point $x\in X$, there is a smallest neighborhood of $x$, namely the basic open set $S_x$ of divisors of $x$. So the divisor topology is an Alexandrov topology.
- $X$ is a T_{0} space. Indeed, given two points $x$ and $y$ with $x<y$, the open neighborhood $S_x$ of $x$ does not contain $y$.
- $X$ is a not a T_{1} space, as no point is closed. Consequently, $X$ is not Hausdorff.
- The isolated points of $X$ are the prime numbers.
- The set of prime numbers is dense in $X$. In fact, every dense open set must include every prime, and therefore $X$ is a Baire space.
- $X$ is second-countable.
- $X$ is ultraconnected, since the closures of the singletons $\{x\}$ and $\{y\}$ contain the product $xy$ as a common element.
- Hence $X$ is a normal space. But $X$ is not completely normal. For example, the singletons $\{6\}$ and $\{4\}$ are separated sets (6 is not a multiple of 4 and 4 is not a multiple of 6), but have no disjoint open neighborhoods, as their smallest respective open neighborhoods meet non-trivially in $S_6\cap S_4=S_2$.
- $X$ is not a regular space, as a basic neighborhood $S_x$ is finite, but the closure of a point is infinite.
- $X$ is connected, locally connected, path connected and locally path connected.
- $X$ is a scattered space, as each nonempty subset has a first element, which is an isolated element of the set.
- The compact subsets of $X$ are the finite subsets, since any set $A\subseteq X$ is covered by the collection of all basic open sets $S_n$, which are each finite, and if $A$ is covered by only finitely many of them, it must itself be finite. In particular, $X$ is not compact.
- $X$ is locally compact in the sense that each point has a compact neighborhood ($S_x$ is finite). But points don't have closed compact neighborhoods ($X$ is not locally relatively compact.)
