= Particular point topology =

Topology where a set is open if it contains a particular point

In mathematics, the particular point topology (or included point topology) is a topology where a set is open if it contains a particular point of the topological space. Formally, let X be any non-empty set and p ∈ X. The collection

$$T = \{S \subseteq X \mid p \in S \} \cup \{\emptyset\}$$

of subsets of X is the particular point topology on X. There are a variety of cases that are individually named:

- If X has two points, the particular point topology on X is the Sierpiński space.
- If X is finite (with at least 3 points), the topology on X is called the finite particular point topology.
- If X is countably infinite, the topology on X is called the countable particular point topology.
- If X is uncountable, the topology on X is called the uncountable particular point topology.

A generalization of the particular point topology is the closed extension topology. In the case when X \ {p} has the discrete topology, the closed extension topology is the same as the particular point topology.

This topology is used to provide interesting examples and counterexamples.

== Properties ==
Closed sets have empty interior
Given a nonempty open set $A \subseteq X$ every $x \ne p$ is a limit point of A. So the closure of any open set other than $\emptyset$ is $X$. No closed set other than $X$ contains p so the interior of every closed set other than $X$ is $\emptyset$.

=== Connectedness ===
Path and locally connected but not arc connected

For any x, y ∈ X, the function f: [0, 1] → X given by

$$f(t) = \begin{cases} x & t=0 \\
p & t\in(0,1) \\
y & t=1
\end{cases}$$

is a path. However, since p is open, the preimage of p under a continuous injection from [0,1] would be an open single point of [0,1], which is a contradiction.

Dispersion point, example of a set with
p is a dispersion point for X. That is X \ {p} is totally disconnected.

Hyperconnected but not ultraconnected
Every non-empty open set contains p, and hence X is hyperconnected. But if a and b are in X such that p, a, and b are three distinct points, then {a} and {b} are disjoint closed sets and thus X is not ultraconnected. Note that if X is the Sierpiński space then no such a and b exist and X is in fact ultraconnected.

=== Compactness ===
Compact only if finite. Lindelöf only if countable.
If X is finite, it is compact; and if X is infinite, it is not compact, since the family of all open sets $\{p,x\}\;(x\in X)$ forms an open cover with no finite subcover.

For similar reasons, if X is countable, it is a Lindelöf space; and if X is uncountable, it is not Lindelöf.

Closure of compact not compact
The set {p} is compact. However its closure (the closure of a compact set) is the entire space X, and if X is infinite this is not compact. For similar reasons if X is uncountable then we have an example where the closure of a compact set is not a Lindelöf space.

Pseudocompact but not weakly countably compact
First there are no disjoint non-empty open sets (since all open sets contain p). Hence every continuous function to the real line must be constant, and hence bounded, proving that X is a pseudocompact space. Any set not containing p does not have a limit point thus if X if infinite it is not weakly countably compact.

Locally compact but not locally relatively compact.
If $x\in X$, then the set $\{x,p\}$ is a compact neighborhood of x. However the closure of this neighborhood is all of X, and hence if X is infinite, x does not have a closed compact neighborhood, and X is not locally relatively compact.

=== Limit-related ===
Accumulation points of sets
If $Y\subseteq X$ does not contain p, Y has no accumulation point (because Y is closed in X and discrete in the subspace topology).

If $Y\subseteq X$ contains p, every point $x\ne p$ is an accumulation point of Y, since $\{x,p\}$ (the smallest neighborhood of $x$) meets Y. Y has no ω-accumulation point. Note that p is never an accumulation point of any set, as it is isolated in X.

Accumulation point as a set but not as a sequence
Take a sequence $(a_n)_n$ of distinct elements that also contains p. The underlying set $\{a_n\}$ has any $x\ne p$ as an accumulation point. However the sequence itself has no accumulation point as a sequence, as the neighbourhood $\{y,p\}$ of any y cannot contain infinitely many of the distinct $a_n$.

=== Separation-related ===
T_{0}
X is T_{0} (since {x, p} is open for each x) but satisfies no higher separation axioms (because all non-empty open sets must contain p).

Not regular
Since every non-empty open set contains p, no closed set not containing p (such as X \ {p}) can be separated by neighbourhoods from {p}, and thus X is not regular. Since complete regularity implies regularity, X is not completely regular.

Not normal
Since every non-empty open set contains p, no non-empty closed sets can be separated by neighbourhoods from each other, and thus X is not normal. Exception: the Sierpiński topology is normal, and even completely normal, since it contains no nontrivial separated sets.

=== Other properties ===
Separability
{p} is dense and hence X is a separable space. However if X is uncountable then X \ {p} is not separable. This is an example of a subspace of a separable space not being separable.

Countability (first but not second)
If X is uncountable then X is first countable but not second countable.

Alexandrov-discrete
The topology is an Alexandrov topology. The smallest neighbourhood of a point $x$ is $\{x,p\}.$

Comparable (Homeomorphic topologies on the same set that are not comparable)
Let $p, q \in X$ with $p \ne q$. Let $t_p = \{S \subseteq X \mid p\in S\}$ and $t_q = \{S \subseteq X \mid q\in S\}$. That is t_{q} is the particular point topology on X with q being the distinguished point. Then (X,t_{p}) and (X,t_{q}) are homeomorphic incomparable topologies on the same set.

No nonempty dense-in-itself subset
Let S be a nonempty subset of X. If S contains p, then p is isolated in S (since it is an isolated point of X). If S does not contain p, any x in S is isolated in S.

Not first category
Any set containing p is dense in X. Hence X is not a union of nowhere dense subsets.

Subspaces
Every subspace of a set given the particular point topology that doesn't contain the particular point, has the discrete topology.

== See also ==
- Alexandrov topology
- Excluded point topology
- Finite topological space
- List of topologies
- One-point compactification
- Overlapping interval topology
