= Dispersion point =

Point in a topological space

In topology, a dispersion point of a topological space $X$ is a point $p\in X$ such that $X$ is connected and removing the point leaves $X\setminus\{p\}$ totally disconnected (meaning that its connected components are all singletons, i.e., $X\setminus\{p\}$ contains no connected subset of size at least two).

Examples of spaces with a dispersion point include:

- the Knaster–Kuratowski fan,
- spaces with a particular point topology,
- spaces with an excluded point topology.

A connected space $X$ with $|X|\ge 3$ can have at most one dispersion point. The case $|X|=2$ (covering the Sierpiński space and the indiscrete space of size two) is a degenerate case, where every point of $X$ is a dispersion point (because removing a point leaves a singleton, which is totally disconnected).

== Explosion point ==
An explosion point of a topological space $X$ is a point $p\in X$ such that $X$ is connected and removing the point leaves $X\setminus\{p\}$ totally separated (meaning that for any two distinct points $x$ and $y$ there is a clopen set containing $x$ and not $y$).

Every explosion point is a dispersion point (because totally separated spaces are totally disconnected).

Examples of spaces with an explosion point include spaces with a particular point topology and spaces with an excluded point topology. The Knaster–Kuratowski fan has a dispersion point which is not an explosion point.

A space of size at least three can have at most one explosion point.

If p is an explosion point for a space X, then the totally separated space $X\setminus \{p\}$ is said to be pulverized.
