= First uncountable ordinal =

Smallest ordinal number that, considered as a set, is uncountable

In mathematics, the first uncountable ordinal, traditionally denoted by $\omega_1$ or sometimes by $\Omega$, is the smallest ordinal number that is the order type of an uncountable well-ordered set. It is the supremum (least upper bound) of all countable ordinals. In the von Neumann representation, the elements of $\omega_1$ are the countable ordinals (including finite ordinals), of which there are uncountably many.

The cardinality of the set $\omega_1$ is the first uncountable cardinal number, $\aleph_1$ (aleph-one). The ordinal $\omega_1$ is thus the initial ordinal of $\aleph_1$. Like all other initial ordinals of infinite cardinals, $\omega_1$ is a limit ordinal, i.e. there is no ordinal $\alpha$ such that $\omega_1 = \alpha+1$. Formally, cardinal numbers are usually represented as their initial ordinals, in which case $\omega_1$ and $\aleph_1$ are considered equal as sets. More generally, for any ordinal $\alpha$, $\omega_\alpha$ denotes the initial ordinal of the cardinal $\aleph_\alpha$.

The continuum hypothesis (CH) states that $\beth_1 = \aleph_1$ (where $\beth_1 = 2 ^ {\aleph_0} = \vert \mathbb{R} \vert$ is the second beth number), which implies that $\vert \omega_1 \vert = \vert \mathbb{R} \vert$, i.e., the countable ordinals are equinumerous to the real numbers. If CH does not hold, but the axiom of choice (AC) does, then $\vert \omega_1 \vert$, as the smallest uncountable cardinal, is strictly less than $\vert \mathbb{R} \vert$. If AC also does not hold then $\vert \omega_1 \vert$ may be incomparable with $\vert \mathbb{R} \vert$, but never larger than $\vert \mathbb{R} \vert$.

The existence of $\omega_1$ does not depend on AC, as it can be constructed explicitly as the Hartogs number of $\omega_0 = \mathbb{N}$. More concretely, the set of all well-orderings on $\mathbb{N}$ can be constructed as a subset of all binary relations on $\mathbb{N}$, and thus applying the axiom of replacement to replace every well-ordering with its order type will give $\omega_1$.

== Topological properties ==
Any ordinal number can be turned into a topological space by using the order topology. When viewed as a topological space, $\omega_1$ is often written as $[0,\omega_1)$, to emphasize that it is the space consisting of all ordinals smaller than $\omega_1$.

If the axiom of countable choice holds, every increasing ω-sequence of elements of $[0,\omega_1]$ converges to a limit in $[0,\omega_1]$. The reason is that the union (i.e., supremum) of every countable set of countable ordinals is another countable ordinal.

The topological space $[0,\omega_1)$ is sequentially compact, but not compact. As a consequence, it is not metrizable. It is, however, countably compact and thus not Lindelöf (a countably compact space is compact if and only if it is Lindelöf). In terms of axioms of countability, $[0,\omega_1)$ is first-countable, but neither separable nor second-countable.

The space $[0,\omega_1]=\omega_1 + 1$ is compact and not first-countable. $\omega_1$ is used to define the long line and the Tychonoff plank—two important counterexamples in topology.

== See also ==
- Epsilon numbers (mathematics)
- Large countable ordinal
- Ordinal arithmetic

== Bibliography ==
- Thomas Jech, Set Theory, 3rd millennium ed., 2003, Springer Monographs in Mathematics, Springer, ISBN 3-540-44085-2.
- Lynn Arthur Steen and J. Arthur Seebach, Jr., Counterexamples in Topology. Springer-Verlag, New York, 1978. Reprinted by Dover Publications, New York, 1995. ISBN 0-486-68735-X (Dover edition).
