= History of the separation axioms =

Separation axioms in topological spaces

Kolmogorov classification
- T_{0}: (Kolmogorov)
- T_{1}: (Fréchet)
- T_{2}: (Hausdorff)
- T_{2½}: (Urysohn)
- completely T_{2}: (completely Hausdorff)
- T_{3}: (regular Hausdorff)
- T_{3½}: (Tychonoff)
- T_{4}: (normal Hausdorff)
- T_{5}: (completely normal Hausdorff)
- T_{6}: (perfectly normal Hausdorff)

The history of the separation axioms in general topology has been convoluted, with many meanings competing for the same terms and many terms competing for the same concept.

== Origins ==
Before the current general definition of topological space, there were many definitions offered, some of which assumed (what we now think of as) some separation axioms. For example, the definition given by Felix Hausdorff in 1914 is equivalent to the modern definition plus the Hausdorff separation axiom.

The separation axioms, as a group, became important in the study of metrisability: the question of which topological spaces can be given the structure of a metric space. Metric spaces satisfy all of the separation axioms; but in fact, studying spaces that satisfy only some axioms helps build up to the notion of full metrisability.

The separation axioms that were first studied together in this way were the axioms for accessible spaces, Hausdorff spaces, regular spaces, and normal spaces. Topologists assigned these classes of spaces the names T_{1}, T_{2}, T_{3}, and T_{4}. Later this system of numbering was extended to include T_{0}, T_{2½}, T_{3½} (or T_{π}), T_{5}, and T_{6}.

But this sequence had its problems. The idea was supposed to be that every T_{i} space is a special kind of T_{j} space if i > j. But this is not necessarily true, as definitions vary. For example, a regular space (called T_{3}) does not have to be a Hausdorff space (called T_{2}), at least not according to the simplest definition of regular spaces.

== Different definitions ==
Every author agreed on T_{0}, T_{1}, and T_{2}. For the other axioms, however, different authors could use significantly different definitions, depending on what they were working on. These differences could develop because, if one assumes that a topological space satisfies the T_{1} axiom, then the various definitions are (in most cases) equivalent. Thus, if one is going to make that assumption, then one would want to use the simplest definition. But if one did not make that assumption, then the simplest definition might not be the right one for the most useful concept; in any case, it would destroy the (transitive) entailment of T_{i} by T_{j}, allowing (for example) non-Hausdorff regular spaces.

Topologists working on the metrisation problem generally did assume T_{1}; after all, all metric spaces are T_{1}. Thus, they used the simplest definitions for the T_{i}. Then, for those occasions when they did not assume T_{1}, they used words ("regular" and "normal") for the more complicated definitions, in order to contrast them with the simpler ones. This approach was used as late as 1970 with the publication of Counterexamples in Topology by Lynn A. Steen and J. Arthur Seebach, Jr.

In contrast, general topologists, led by John L. Kelley in 1955, usually did not assume T_{1}, so they studied the separation axioms in the greatest generality from the beginning. They used the more complicated definitions for T_{i}, so that they would always have a nice property relating T_{i} to T_{j}. Then, for the simpler definitions, they used words (again, "regular" and "normal"). Both conventions could be said to follow the "original" meanings; the different meanings are the same for T_{1} spaces, which was the original context. But the result was that different authors used the various terms in precisely opposite ways. Adding to the confusion, some literature will observe a nice distinction between an axiom and the space that satisfies the axiom, so that a T_{3} space might need to satisfy the axioms T_{3} and T_{0} (e.g., in the Encyclopedic Dictionary of Mathematics, 2nd ed.).

Since 1970, the general topologists' terms have been growing in popularity, including in other branches of mathematics, such as analysis. But usage is still not consistent.

== Completely Hausdorff, Urysohn, and T_{2 1/2} spaces ==
Steen and Seebach define a Urysohn space as "a space with a Urysohn function for any two points". Willard calls this a completely Hausdorff space. Steen & Seebach define a completely Hausdorff space or T_{2 1/2} space as a space in which every two points are separated by closed neighborhoods, which Willard calls a Urysohn space or T_{2 1/2} space.

== See also ==
- History of topology
