= Extension topology =

In topology, a branch of mathematics, an extension topology is a topology placed on the disjoint union of a topological space and another set. There are various types of extension topology, described in the sections below.

== Extension topology ==
Let X be a topological space and P a set disjoint from X. Consider in X ∪ P the topology whose open sets are of the form A ∪ Q, where A is an open set of X and Q is a subset of P.

The closed sets of X ∪ P are of the form B ∪ Q, where B is a closed set of X and Q is a subset of P.

For these reasons this topology is called the extension topology of X plus P, with which one extends to X ∪ P the open and the closed sets of X. As subsets of X ∪ P the subspace topology of X is the original topology of X, while the subspace topology of P is the discrete topology. As a topological space, X ∪ P is homeomorphic to the topological sum of X and P, and X is a clopen subset of X ∪ P.

If Y is a topological space and R is a subset of Y, one might ask whether the extension topology of Y – R plus R is the same as the original topology of Y, and the answer is in general no.

Note the similarity of this extension topology construction and the Alexandroff one-point compactification, in which case, having a topological space X which one wishes to compactify by adding a point ∞ at infinity, one considers the closed sets of X ∪ {∞} to be the sets of the form K, where K is a closed compact set of X, or B ∪ {∞}, where B is a closed set of X.

== Open extension topology ==
Let $(X, \mathcal{T})$ be a topological space and $P$ a set disjoint from $X$. The open extension topology of $\mathcal{T}$ plus $P$ is
$$\mathcal{T}^* = \mathcal{T} \cup \{X \cup A : A \subset P\}.$$
Let $X^* = X \cup P$. Then $\mathcal{T}^*$ is a topology in $X^*$. The subspace topology of $X$ is the original topology of $X$, i.e. $\mathcal{T}^*|X = \mathcal{T}$, while the subspace topology of $P$ is the discrete topology, i.e. $\mathcal{T}^*|P = \mathcal{P}(P)$.

The closed sets in $X^*$ are $\{B \cup P : X \subset B \land X \setminus B \in \mathcal{T}\}$. Note that $P$ is closed in $X^*$ and $X$ is open and dense in $X^*$.

If Y a topological space and R is a subset of Y, one might ask whether the open extension topology of Y – R plus R is the same as the original topology of Y, and the answer is in general no.

Note that the open extension topology of $X^*$ is smaller than the extension topology of $X^*$.

Assuming $X$ and $P$ are not empty to avoid trivialities, here are a few general properties of the open extension topology:

- $X$ is dense in $X^*$.
- If $P$ is finite, $X^*$ is compact. So $X^*$ is a compactification of $X$ in that case.
- $X^*$ is connected.
- If $P$ has a single point, $X^*$ is ultraconnected.

For a set Z and a point p in Z, one obtains the excluded point topology construction by considering in Z the discrete topology and applying the open extension topology construction to Z – {p} plus p.

== Closed extension topology ==
Let X be a topological space and P a set disjoint from X. Consider in X ∪ P the topology whose closed sets are of the form X ∪ Q, where Q is a subset of P, or B, where B is a closed set of X.

For this reason this topology is called the closed extension topology of X plus P, with which one extends to X ∪ P the closed sets of X. As subsets of X ∪ P the subspace topology of X is the original topology of X, while the subspace topology of P is the discrete topology.

The open sets of X ∪ P are of the form Q, where Q is a subset of P, or A ∪ P, where A is an open set of X. Note that P is open in X ∪ P and X is closed in X ∪ P.

If Y is a topological space and R is a subset of Y, one might ask whether the closed extension topology of Y – R plus R is the same as the original topology of Y, and the answer is in general no.

Note that the closed extension topology of X ∪ P is smaller than the extension topology of X ∪ P.

For a set Z and a point p in Z, one obtains the particular point topology construction by considering in Z the discrete topology and applying the closed extension topology construction to Z – {p} plus p.

== Works cited ==
- Steen, Lynn Arthur; Seebach, J. Arthur Jr (1995) [First published 1978], Counterexamples in Topology (Dover reprint of 1978 ed.), Berlin, New York: Springer-Verlag, ISBN 978-0-486-68735-3, MR 0507446
