= Tychonoff axiom =

In mathematics, a Tychnoff axiom may be:

- the T_{3½} axiom that defines Tychonoff spaces; or
- any of the Tychonoff separation axioms.
