= Pseudonormal space =

In mathematics, in the field of topology, a topological space is said to be pseudonormal if given two disjoint closed sets in it, one of which is countable, there are disjoint open sets containing them. Note the following:

- Every normal space is pseudonormal.
- Every pseudonormal space is regular.

An example of a pseudonormal Moore space that is not metrizable was given by F. B. Jones (1937), in connection with the conjecture that all normal Moore spaces are metrizable.
