= Locally finite space =

Topological space in which every point has a finite neighborhood

In the mathematical field of topology, a locally finite space is a topological space in which every point has a finite neighborhood, that is, a neighborhood consisting of finitely many elements.

== Background ==
The conditions for local finiteness were created by Jun-iti Nagata and Yury Smirnov while searching for a stronger version of the Urysohn metrization theorem. The motivation behind local finiteness was to formulate a new way to determine if a topological space $X$ is metrizable without the countable basis requirement from Urysohn's theorem.

== Definitions ==
Let $T = ( S, \tau )$ be a topological space and let $\mathcal{F}$ be a set of subsets of $S$ Then $\mathcal{F}$ is locally finite if and only if each element of $S$ has a neighborhood which intersects a finite number of sets in $\mathcal{F}$.

A locally finite space is an Alexandrov space.

A T_{1} space is locally finite if and only if it is discrete.
