= K-topology =

Topology

In mathematics, particularly in the field of topology, the K-topology, also called Smirnov's deleted sequence topology, is a topology on the set R of real numbers which has some interesting properties. Relative to the standard topology on R, the set $K = \{1/n:n=1,2,\dots\}$ is not closed since it doesn't contain its limit point 0. Relative to the K-topology however, the set K is declared to be closed by adding more open sets to the standard topology on R. Thus the K-topology on R is strictly finer than the standard topology on R. It is mostly useful for counterexamples in basic topology. In particular, it provides an example of a Hausdorff space that is not regular.

== Formal definition ==
Let R be the set of real numbers and let $K = \{1/n:n=1,2,\dots\}.$ The K-topology on R is the topology obtained by taking as a base the collection of all open intervals $(a,b)$ together with all sets of the form $(a,b)\setminus K.$ The neighborhoods of a point $x\ne 0$ are the same as in the usual Euclidean topology. The neighborhoods of $0$ are of the form $V\setminus K$, where $V$ is a neighborhood of $0$ in the usual topology. The open sets in the K-topology are precisely the sets of the form $U\setminus B$ with $U$ open in the usual Euclidean topology and $B\subseteq K.$

== Properties ==
Throughout this section, T will denote the K-topology and (R, T) will denote the set of all real numbers with the K-topology as a topological space.

1. The K-topology is strictly finer than the standard topology on R. Hence it is Hausdorff, but not compact.

2. The K-topology is not regular, because K is a closed set not containing $0$, but the set $K$ and the point $0$ have no disjoint neighborhoods. And as a further consequence, the quotient space of the K-topology obtained by collapsing K to a point is not Hausdorff. This illustrates that a quotient of a Hausdorff space need not be Hausdorff.

3. The K-topology is connected. However, it is not path connected; it has precisely two path components: $(-\infty, 0]$ and $(0, +\infty).$

4. The K-topology is not locally path connected at $0$ and not locally connected at $0$. But it is locally path connected and locally connected everywhere else.

5. The closed interval [0,1] is not compact as a subspace of (R, T) since it is not even limit point compact (K is an infinite closed discrete subspace of (R, T), hence has no limit point in [0,1]). More generally, no subspace A of (R, T) containing K is compact.

== See also ==
- List of topologies
