= Helly space =

In mathematics, and particularly functional analysis, the Helly space, named after Eduard Helly, consists of all monotonically increasing functions ƒ : [0,1] → [0,1], where [0,1] denotes the closed interval given by the set of all x such that 0 ≤ x ≤ 1. In other words, for all 0 ≤ x ≤ 1 we have 0 ≤ ƒ(x) ≤ 1 and also if x ≤ y then ƒ(x) ≤ ƒ(y).

Let the closed interval [0,1] be denoted simply by I. We can form the space I^{I} by taking the uncountable Cartesian product of closed intervals:

$$I^I = \prod_{i \in I} I_i$$

The space I^{I} is exactly the space of functions ƒ : [0,1] → [0,1]. For each point x in [0,1] we assign the point ƒ(x) in I_{x} = [0,1].

Helly's space is convex as a subset of $\mathbb{R}^{[0,1]}$.

== Topology ==
The Helly space is a subset of I^{I}. The space I^{I} has its own topology, namely the product topology. The Helly space has a topology; namely the induced topology as a subset of I^{I}. It is normal Haudsdorff, compact, separable, and first-countable but not second-countable.
