= Nested interval topology =

In mathematics, more specifically general topology, the nested interval topology is an example of a topology given to the open interval (0,1), i.e. the set of all real numbers x such that 0 < x < 1. The open interval (0,1) is the set of all real numbers between 0 and 1; but not including either 0 or 1.

To give the set (0,1) a topology means to say which subsets of (0,1) are "open", and to do so in a way that the following axioms are met:

1. The union of open sets is an open set.
2. The finite intersection of open sets is an open set.
3. The set (0,1) and the empty set ∅ are open sets.

== Construction ==
The set (0,1) and the empty set ∅ are required to be open sets, and so we define (0,1) and ∅ to be open sets in this topology. The other open sets in this topology are all of the form (0,1 − 1/n) where n is a positive whole number greater than or equal to two i.e. n = 2, 3, 4, 5, ....

== Properties ==
- The nested interval topology is neither Hausdorff nor T1. In fact, if x is an element of (0,1), then the closure of the singleton set {x} is the half-open interval [1 − 1/n,1), where n is maximal such that n ≤ (1 − x)^{−1}.
- The nested interval topology is not compact. It is, however, strongly Lindelöf since there are only countably many open sets.
- The nested interval topology is hyperconnected and hence connected.
- The nested interval topology is Alexandrov.
