= Compact complement topology =

In mathematics, the compact complement topology is a topology defined on the set $\scriptstyle\mathbb{R}$ of real numbers, defined by declaring a subset $\scriptstyle X \subseteq \mathbb{R}$ open if and only if it is either empty or its complement is compact in the standard Euclidean topology on $\scriptstyle\mathbb{R}$.
