= Rational sequence topology =

Mathematical theory related to general topology

In mathematics, more specifically general topology, the rational sequence topology is an example of a topology given to the set R of real numbers.

== Construction ==
For each irrational number x take a sequence of rational numbers {x_{k}} with the property that {x_{k}} converges to x with respect to the Euclidean topology.

The rational sequence topology is specified by letting each rational number singleton to be open, and using as a neighborhood base for each irrational number x, the sets $U_n(x) = \{ x_k : k \ge n \} \cup \{x\}.$
