= Sierpiński space =

Finite topological space with two points, only one of which is closed

In mathematics, the Sierpiński space is a finite topological space with two points, only one of which is closed. It is the smallest example of a topological space which is neither trivial nor discrete. It is named after Wacław Sierpiński.

The Sierpiński space has important relations to the theory of computation and semantics, because it is the classifying space for open sets in the Scott topology.

== Definition and fundamental properties ==
Explicitly, the Sierpiński space is a topological space S whose underlying point set is $\{0, 1\}$ and whose open sets are
$$\{\varnothing,\{1\}, \{0,1\}\}.$$
The closed sets are
$$\{\varnothing, \{0\}, \{0,1\}\}.$$
So the singleton set $\{0\}$ is closed and the set $\{1\}$ is open ($\varnothing = \{ \, \}$ is the empty set).

The closure operator on S is determined by
$$\overline{\{0\}} = \{0\}, \qquad \overline{\{1\}} = \{0,1\}.$$

A finite topological space is also uniquely determined by its specialization preorder. For the Sierpiński space this preorder is actually a total order and given by
$$0 \leq 0, \qquad 0 \leq 1, \qquad 1 \leq 1.$$

== Topological properties ==
The Sierpiński space $S$ is a special case of both the finite particular point topology (with particular point 1) and the finite excluded point topology (with excluded point 0). Therefore, $S$ has many properties in common with one or both of these families.

=== Separation ===
- The points 0 and 1 are topologically distinguishable in S since $\{1\}$ is an open set which contains only one of these points. Therefore, S is a Kolmogorov (T_{0}) space.
- However, S is not T_{1} since the point 1 is not closed. It follows that S is not Hausdorff, or T_{n} for any $n \geq 1.$
- S is not regular (or completely regular) since the point 1 and the disjoint closed set $\{0\}$ cannot be separated by neighborhoods. (Also regularity in the presence of T_{0} would imply Hausdorff.)
- S is vacuously normal and completely normal since there are no nonempty separated sets.
- S is not perfectly normal since the disjoint closed sets $\varnothing$ and $\{0\}$ cannot be precisely separated by a function. Indeed, $\{0\}$ cannot be the zero set of any continuous function $S \to \Reals$ since every such function is constant.

=== Connectedness ===
- The Sierpiński space S is both hyperconnected (since every nonempty open set contains 1) and ultraconnected (since every nonempty closed set contains 0).
- It follows that S is both connected and path connected.
- A path from 0 to 1 in S is given by the function: $f(0) = 0$ and $f(t) = 1$ for $t > 0.$ The function $f : I \to S$ is continuous since $f^{-1}(1) = (0, 1]$ which is open in I.
- Like all finite topological spaces, S is locally path connected.
- The Sierpiński space is contractible, so the fundamental group of S is trivial (as are all the higher homotopy groups).

=== Compactness ===
- Like all finite topological spaces, the Sierpiński space is both compact and second-countable.
- The compact subset $\{1\}$ of S is not closed showing that compact subsets of T_{0} spaces need not be closed.
- Every open cover of S must contain S itself since S is the only open neighborhood of 0. Therefore, every open cover of S has an open subcover consisting of a single set: $\{S\}.$
- It follows that S is fully normal.

=== Convergence ===
- Every sequence in S converges to the point 0. This is because the only neighborhood of 0 is S itself.
- A sequence in S converges to 1 if and only if the sequence contains only finitely many terms equal to 0 (i.e. the sequence is eventually just 1's).
- The point 1 is a cluster point of a sequence in S if and only if the sequence contains infinitely many 1's.
- Examples:
  - 1 is not a cluster point of $(0,0,0,0,\ldots).$
  - 1 is a cluster point (but not a limit) of $(0,1,0,1,0,1,\ldots).$
  - The sequence $(1,1,1,1,\ldots)$ converges to both 0 and 1.

=== Metrizability ===
- The Sierpiński space S is not metrizable or even pseudometrizable since every pseudometric space is completely regular but the Sierpiński space is not even regular.
- S is generated by the hemimetric (or pseudo-quasimetric) $d(0, 1) = 0$ and $d(1,0) = 1.$

=== Other properties ===
- There are only three continuous maps from S to itself: the identity map and the constant maps to 0 and 1.
- It follows that the homeomorphism group of S is trivial.

== Continuous functions to the Sierpiński space ==
Let X be an arbitrary set. The set of all functions from X to the set $\{0, 1\}$ is typically denoted $2^X.$ These functions are precisely the characteristic functions of X. Each such function is of the form
$$\chi_U(x) = \begin{cases}1 & x \in U \\ 0 & x \not\in U\end{cases}$$
where U is a subset of X. In other words, the set of functions $2^X$ is in bijective correspondence with $P(X),$ the power set of X. Every subset U of X has its characteristic function $\chi_U$ and every function from X to $\{0, 1\}$ is of this form.

Now suppose X is a topological space and let $\{0, 1\}$ have the Sierpiński topology. Then a function $\chi_U : X \to S$ is continuous if and only if $\chi_U^{-1}(1)$ is open in X. But, by definition
$$\chi_U^{-1}(1) = U.$$
So $\chi_U$ is continuous if and only if U is open in X. Let $C(X, S)$ denote the set of all continuous maps from X to S and let $T(X)$ denote the topology of X (that is, the family of all open sets). Then we have a bijection from $T(X)$ to $C(X, S)$ which sends the open set $U$ to $\chi_U.$
$$C(X, S) \cong T(X)$$
That is, if we identify $2^X$ with $P(X)$ the subset of continuous maps $C(X, S) \subseteq 2^X$ is precisely the topology of $X:$ $T(X) \subseteq P(X).$

A particularly notable example of this is the Scott topology for partially ordered sets, in which the Sierpiński space becomes the classifying space for open sets when the characteristic function preserves directed joins.

=== Categorical description ===
The above construction can be described nicely using the language of category theory. There is a contravariant functor $T : \mathbf{Top} \to \mathbf{Set}$ from the category of topological spaces to the category of sets which assigns each topological space $X$ its set of open sets $T(X)$ and each continuous function $f : X \to Y$ the preimage map
$$f^{-1} : T(Y) \to T(X).$$
The statement then becomes: the functor $T$ is represented by $(S, \{1\})$ where $S$ is the Sierpiński space. That is, $T$ is naturally isomorphic to the Hom functor $\operatorname{Hom}(-, S)$ with the natural isomorphism determined by the universal element $\{1\} \in T(S).$ This is generalized by the notion of a presheaf.

=== The initial topology ===
Any topological space X has the initial topology induced by the family $C(X, S)$ of continuous functions to Sierpiński space. Indeed, in order to coarsen the topology on X one must remove open sets. But removing the open set U would render $\chi_U$ discontinuous. So X has the coarsest topology for which each function in $C(X, S)$ is continuous.

The family of functions $C(X, S)$ separates points in X if and only if X is a T_{0} space. Two points $x$ and $y$ will be separated by the function $\chi_U$ if and only if the open set U contains precisely one of the two points. This is exactly what it means for $x$ and $y$ to be topologically distinguishable.

Therefore, if X is T_{0}, we can embed X as a subspace of a product of Sierpiński spaces, where there is one copy of S for each open set U in X. The embedding map
$$e : X \to \prod_{U \in T(X)} S = S^{T(X)}$$
is given by
$$e(x)_U = \chi_U(x).\,$$
Since subspaces and products of T_{0} spaces are T_{0}, it follows that a topological space is T_{0} if and only if it is homeomorphic to a subspace of a power of S.

== In algebraic geometry ==
In algebraic geometry the Sierpiński space arises as the spectrum $\operatorname{Spec}(R)$ of a discrete valuation ring $R$ such as $\Z_{(p)}$ (the localization of the integers at the prime ideal generated by the prime number $p$). The generic point of $\operatorname{Spec}(R),$ coming from the zero ideal, corresponds to the open point 1, while the special point of $\operatorname{Spec}(R),$ coming from the unique maximal ideal, corresponds to the closed point 0.

== See also ==
- Finite topological space – Mathematical concept
- Freyd cover, a categorical construction related to the Sierpiński space
- List of topologies – List of concrete topologies and topological spaces
- Pseudocircle – Four-point non-Hausdorff topological space
