= Either–or topology =

In mathematics, the either–or topology is a topological structure defined on the closed interval [−1, 1] by declaring a set open if it either contains (−1, 1) or does not contain the singleton {0}. Thus, the only non-trivial closed sets are {1}, {-1}, {−1, 1} and any set containing {0}.

Since any open cover of [−1, 1] must include an open set containing {0}, this space is compact and thus Lindelöf.
