= Trivial topology =

Topology where the only open sets are the empty set and the entire space

In topology, a topological space with the trivial topology is one where the only open sets are the empty set and the entire space. Such spaces are commonly called indiscrete, anti-discrete, concrete or codiscrete. Intuitively, this has the consequence that all points of the space are "lumped together" and cannot be distinguished by topological means. Every indiscrete space can be viewed as a pseudometric space in which the distance between any two points is zero.

== Details ==
The trivial topology is the topology with the least possible number of open sets, namely the empty set and the entire space, since the definition of a topology requires these two sets to be open. Despite its simplicity, a space X with more than one element and the trivial topology lacks a key desirable property: it is not a T_{0} space.

Other properties of an indiscrete space X—many of which are quite unusual—include:

- The only closed sets are the empty set and X.
- The only possible basis of X is {X}.
- If X has more than one point, then since it is not T_{0}, it does not satisfy any of the higher T axioms either. In particular, it is not a Hausdorff space. Not being Hausdorff, X is not an order topology, nor is it metrizable.
- X is, however, regular, completely regular, normal, and completely normal; all in a rather vacuous way though, since the only closed sets are ∅ and X.
- X is compact and therefore paracompact, Lindelöf, and locally compact.
- Every function whose domain is a topological space and codomain X is continuous.
- X is path-connected and so connected.
- X is second-countable, and therefore is first-countable, separable and Lindelöf.
- All subspaces of X have the trivial topology.
- All quotient spaces of X have the trivial topology
- Arbitrary products of trivial topological spaces, with either the product topology or box topology, have the trivial topology.
- All sequences in X converge to every point of X. In particular, every sequence has a convergent subsequence (the whole sequence or any other subsequence), thus X is sequentially compact.
- The interior of every set except X is empty.
- The closure of every non-empty subset of X is X. Put another way: every non-empty subset of X is dense, a property that characterizes trivial topological spaces.
  - As a result of this, the closure of every open subset U of X is either ∅ (if U = ∅) or X (otherwise). In particular, the closure of every open subset of X is again an open set, and therefore X is extremally disconnected.
- If S is any subset of X with more than one element, then all elements of X are limit points of S. If S is a singleton, then every point of X \ S is still a limit point of S.
- X is a Baire space.
- Two topological spaces carrying the trivial topology are homeomorphic iff they have the same cardinality.

In some sense the opposite of the trivial topology is the discrete topology, in which every subset is open.

The trivial topology belongs to a uniform space in which the whole cartesian product X × X is the only entourage.

Let Top be the category of topological spaces with continuous maps and Set be the category of sets with functions. If G : Top → Set is the functor that assigns to each topological space its underlying set (the so-called forgetful functor), and H : Set → Top is the functor that puts the trivial topology on a given set, then H (the so-called cofree functor) is right adjoint to G. (The so-called free functor F : Set → Top that puts the discrete topology on a given set is left adjoint to G.)

== See also ==
- List of topologies
- Triviality (mathematics)
