= Tychonoff space =

Type of regular Hausdorff space

Separation axioms in topological spaces

Kolmogorov classification
- T_{0}: (Kolmogorov)
- T_{1}: (Fréchet)
- T_{2}: (Hausdorff)
- T_{2½}: (Urysohn)
- completely T_{2}: (completely Hausdorff)
- T_{3}: (regular Hausdorff)
- T_{3½}: (Tychonoff)
- T_{4}: (normal Hausdorff)
- T_{5}: (completely normal Hausdorff)
- T_{6}: (perfectly normal Hausdorff)

In topology and related branches of mathematics, Tychonoff spaces and completely regular spaces are kinds of topological spaces. These conditions are examples of separation axioms. A Tychonoff space is any completely regular space that is also a Hausdorff space; there exist completely regular spaces that are not Tychonoff (i.e. not Hausdorff).

Paul Urysohn had used the notion of completely regular space in a 1925 paper without giving it a name. But it was Andrey Tychonoff who introduced the terminology completely regular in 1930.

== Definitions ==
Separation of a point from a closed set via a continuous function.

A topological space $X$ is called completely regular if points can be separated from closed sets via (bounded) continuous real-valued functions. In technical terms this means: for any closed set $A \subseteq X$ and any point $x \in X \setminus A,$ there exists a real-valued continuous function $f : X \to \R$ such that $f(x)=1$ and $f\vert_{A} = 0.$ (Equivalently one can choose any two values instead of $0$ and $1$ and even require that $f$ be a bounded function.)

A topological space is called a Tychonoff space (alternatively: T_{3½} space, or T_{π} space, or completely T_{3} space) if it is a completely regular Hausdorff space.

Remark. Completely regular spaces and Tychonoff spaces are related through the notion of Kolmogorov equivalence. A topological space is Tychonoff if and only if it is both completely regular and T_{0}. On the other hand, a space is completely regular if and only if its Kolmogorov quotient is Tychonoff.

== Naming conventions ==
Across mathematical literature different conventions are applied when it comes to the term "completely regular" and the "T"-Axioms. The definitions in this section are in typical modern usage. Some authors, however, switch the meanings of the two kinds of terms, or use all terms interchangeably. In Wikipedia, the terms "completely regular" and "Tychonoff" are used freely and the "T"-notation is generally avoided. In standard literature, caution is thus advised, to find out which definitions the author is using. For more on this issue, see History of the separation axioms.

== Examples ==
Almost every topological space studied in mathematical analysis is Tychonoff, or at least completely regular. For example, the real line is Tychonoff under the standard Euclidean topology. Other examples include:

- Every metric space is Tychonoff; every pseudometric space is completely regular.
- Every locally compact regular space is completely regular, and therefore every locally compact Hausdorff space is Tychonoff.
- In particular, every topological manifold is Tychonoff.
- Every totally ordered set with the order topology is Tychonoff.
- Every topological group is completely regular.
- Every pseudometrizable space is completely regular, but not Tychonoff if the space is not Hausdorff.
- Every seminormed space is completely regular (both because it is pseudometrizable and because it is a topological vector space, hence a topological group). But it will not be Tychonoff if the seminorm is not a norm.
- Generalizing both the metric spaces and the topological groups, every uniform space is completely regular. The converse is also true: every completely regular space is uniformisable.
- Every CW complex is Tychonoff.
- Every normal regular space is completely regular, and every normal Hausdorff space is Tychonoff.
- The Niemytzki plane is an example of a Tychonoff space that is not normal.

There are regular Hausdorff spaces that are not completely regular, but such examples are complicated to construct. One of them is the so-called Tychonoff corkscrew, which contains two points such that any continuous real-valued function on the space has the same value at these two points. An even more complicated construction starts with the Tychonoff corkscrew and builds a regular Hausdorff space called Hewitt's condensed corkscrew, which is not completely regular in a stronger way, namely, every continuous real-valued function on the space is constant.

== Properties ==
=== Preservation ===
Complete regularity and the Tychonoff property are well-behaved with respect to initial topologies. Specifically, complete regularity is preserved by taking arbitrary initial topologies and the Tychonoff property is preserved by taking point-separating initial topologies. It follows that:

- Every subspace of a completely regular or Tychonoff space has the same property.
- A nonempty product space is completely regular (respectively Tychonoff) if and only if each factor space is completely regular (respectively Tychonoff).

Like all separation axioms, complete regularity is not preserved by taking final topologies. In particular, quotients of completely regular spaces need not be regular. Quotients of Tychonoff spaces need not even be Hausdorff, with one elementary counterexample being the line with two origins. There are closed quotients of the Moore plane that provide counterexamples.

=== Real-valued continuous functions ===
For any topological space $X,$ let $C(X)$ denote the family of real-valued continuous functions on $X$ and let $C_b(X)$ be the subset of bounded real-valued continuous functions.

Completely regular spaces can be characterized by the fact that their topology is completely determined by $C(X)$ or $C_b(X).$ In particular:

- A space $X$ is completely regular if and only if it has the initial topology induced by $C(X)$ or $C_b(X).$
- A space $X$ is completely regular if and only if every closed set can be written as the intersection of a family of zero sets in $X$ (i.e. the zero sets form a basis for the closed sets of $X$).
- A space $X$ is completely regular if and only if the cozero sets of $X$ form a basis for the topology of $X.$

Given an arbitrary topological space $(X, \tau)$ there is a universal way of associating a completely regular space with $(X, \tau).$ Let ρ be the initial topology on $X$ induced by $C_{\tau}(X)$ or, equivalently, the topology generated by the basis of cozero sets in $(X, \tau).$ Then ρ will be the finest completely regular topology on $X$ that is coarser than $\tau.$ This construction is universal in the sense that any continuous function
$$f : (X, \tau) \to Y$$
to a completely regular space $Y$ will be continuous on $(X, \rho).$ In the language of category theory, the functor that sends $(X, \tau)$ to $(X, \rho)$ is left adjoint to the inclusion functor CReg → Top. Thus the category of completely regular spaces CReg is a reflective subcategory of Top, the category of topological spaces. By taking Kolmogorov quotients, one sees that the subcategory of Tychonoff spaces is also reflective.

One can show that $C_{\tau}(X) = C_{\rho}(X)$ in the above construction so that the rings $C(X)$ and $C_b(X)$ are typically only studied for completely regular spaces $X.$

The category of realcompact Tychonoff spaces is anti-equivalent to the category of the rings $C(X)$ (where $X$ is realcompact) together with ring homomorphisms as maps. For example one can reconstruct $X$ from $C(X)$ when $X$ is (real) compact. The algebraic theory of these rings is therefore subject of intensive studies. A vast generalization of this class of rings that still resembles many properties of Tychonoff spaces, but is also applicable in real algebraic geometry, is the class of real closed rings.

=== Embeddings ===
Tychonoff spaces are precisely those spaces that can be embedded in compact Hausdorff spaces. More precisely, for every Tychonoff space $X,$ there exists a compact Hausdorff space $K$ such that $X$ is homeomorphic to a subspace of $K.$

In fact, one can always choose $K$ to be a Tychonoff cube (i.e. a possibly infinite product of unit intervals). Every Tychonoff cube is compact Hausdorff as a consequence of Tychonoff's theorem. Since every subspace of a compact Hausdorff space is Tychonoff one has:

A topological space is Tychonoff if and only if it can be embedded in a Tychonoff cube.

=== Compactifications ===
Of particular interest are those embeddings where the image of $X$ is dense in $K;$ these are called Hausdorff compactifications of $X.$ Given any embedding of a Tychonoff space $X$ in a compact Hausdorff space $K$ the closure of the image of $X$ in $K$ is a compactification of $X.$ In the same 1930 article where Tychonoff defined completely regular spaces, he also proved that every Tychonoff space has a Hausdorff compactification.

Among those Hausdorff compactifications, there is a unique "most general" one, the Stone–Čech compactification $\beta X.$ It is characterized by the universal property that, given a continuous map $f$ from $X$ to any other compact Hausdorff space $Y,$ there is a unique continuous map $g : \beta X \to Y$ that extends $f$ in the sense that $f$ is the composition of $g$ and $j.$

=== Uniform structures ===
Complete regularity is exactly the condition necessary for the existence of uniform structures on a topological space. In other words, every uniform space has a completely regular topology and every completely regular space $X$ is uniformizable. A topological space admits a separated uniform structure if and only if it is Tychonoff.

Given a completely regular space $X$ there is usually more than one uniformity on $X$ that is compatible with the topology of $X.$ However, there will always be a finest compatible uniformity, called the fine uniformity on $X.$ If $X$ is Tychonoff, then the uniform structure can be chosen so that $\beta X$ becomes the completion of the uniform space $X.$

== See also ==
- Stone–Čech compactification – Concept in topology

== Bibliography ==
- Gillman, Leonard; Jerison, Meyer (1960). Rings of continuous functions. Graduate Texts in Mathematics, No. 43 (Dover reprint ed.). NY: Springer-Verlag. p. xiii. ISBN 978-048681688-3.
- Steen, Lynn Arthur; Seebach, J. Arthur Jr. (1995) [1978]. Counterexamples in Topology (Dover reprint of 1978 ed.). Berlin, New York: Springer-Verlag. ISBN 978-0-486-68735-3. MR 0507446.
- Willard, Stephen (1970). General Topology (Dover reprint ed.). Reading, Massachusetts: Addison-Wesley Publishing Company. ISBN 0-486-43479-6.
