= Urysohn and completely Hausdorff spaces =

Form of topological spaces

Separation axioms in topological spaces

Kolmogorov classification
- T_{0}: (Kolmogorov)
- T_{1}: (Fréchet)
- T_{2}: (Hausdorff)
- T_{2½}: (Urysohn)
- completely T_{2}: (completely Hausdorff)
- T_{3}: (regular Hausdorff)
- T_{3½}: (Tychonoff)
- T_{4}: (normal Hausdorff)
- T_{5}: (completely normal Hausdorff)
- T_{6}: (perfectly normal Hausdorff)

In topology, a discipline within mathematics, an Urysohn space, or T_{2½} space, is a topological space in which any two distinct points can be separated by closed neighborhoods. A completely Hausdorff space, or functionally Hausdorff space, is a topological space in which any two distinct points can be separated by a continuous function. These conditions are separation axioms that are somewhat stronger than the more familiar Hausdorff axiom T_{2}.

== Definitions ==
Suppose that X is a topological space. Let x and y be points in X.

- We say that x and y can be separated by closed neighborhoods if there exists a closed neighborhood U of x and a closed neighborhood V of y such that U and V are disjoint (U ∩ V = ∅). (Note that a "closed neighborhood of x" is a closed set that contains an open set containing x.)
- We say that x and y can be separated by a function if there exists a continuous function f : X → [0,1] (the unit interval) with f(x) = 0 and f(y) = 1.

A Urysohn space, also called a T_{2½} space, is a space in which any two distinct points can be separated by closed neighborhoods.

A completely Hausdorff space, or functionally Hausdorff space, is a space in which any two distinct points can be separated by a continuous function.

== Naming conventions ==
The study of separation axioms is notorious for conflicts with naming conventions used. The definitions used in this article are those given by Willard (1970) and are the more modern definitions. Steen and Seebach (1970) and various other authors reverse the definition of completely Hausdorff spaces and Urysohn spaces. Readers of textbooks in topology must be sure to check the definitions used by the author. See History of the separation axioms for more on this issue.

== Relation to other separation axioms ==
Any two points which can be separated by a function can be separated by closed neighborhoods. If they can be separated by closed neighborhoods then clearly they can be separated by neighborhoods. It follows that every completely Hausdorff space is Urysohn and every Urysohn space is Hausdorff.

One can also show that every regular Hausdorff space is Urysohn and every Tychonoff space (=completely regular Hausdorff space) is completely Hausdorff. In summary we have the following implications:

Tychonoff (T_{3½})	$\Rightarrow$	regular Hausdorff (T_{3})
$\Downarrow$		$\Downarrow$
completely Hausdorff	$\Rightarrow$	Urysohn (T_{2½})	$\Rightarrow$	Hausdorff (T_{2})	$\Rightarrow$	T_{1}

One can find counterexamples showing that none of these implications reverse.

== Examples ==
The cocountable extension topology is the topology on the real line generated by the union of the usual Euclidean topology and the cocountable topology. Sets are open in this topology if and only if they are of the form U \ A where U is open in the Euclidean topology and A is countable. This space is completely Hausdorff and Urysohn, but not regular (and thus not Tychonoff).

There exist spaces which are Hausdorff but not Urysohn, and spaces which are Urysohn but not completely Hausdorff or regular Hausdorff. Examples are non trivial; for details see Steen and Seebach.
