= Excluded point topology =

Topology where a set is open if it doesn't contain a particular point

In mathematics, the excluded point topology is a topology where exclusion of a particular point defines openness. Formally, let X be any non-empty set and p ∈ X. The collection

$$T = \{S \subseteq X : p \notin S\} \cup \{X\}$$

of subsets of X is then the excluded point topology on X. There are a variety of cases which are individually named:

- If X has two points, it is called the Sierpiński space. This case is somewhat special and is handled separately.
- If X is finite (with at least 3 points), the topology on X is called the finite excluded point topology
- If X is countably infinite, the topology on X is called the countable excluded point topology
- If X is uncountable, the topology on X is called the uncountable excluded point topology

A generalization is the open extension topology; if $X\setminus \{p\}$ has the discrete topology, then the open extension topology on $(X \setminus \{p\}) \cup \{p\}$ is the excluded point topology.

This topology is used to provide interesting examples and counterexamples.

== Properties ==
Let $X$ be a space with the excluded point topology with special point $p.$

The space is compact, as the only neighborhood of $p$ is the whole space.

The topology is an Alexandrov topology. The smallest neighborhood of $p$ is the whole space $X;$ the smallest neighborhood of a point $x\ne p$ is the singleton $\{x\}.$ These smallest neighborhoods are compact. Their closures are respectively $X$ and $\{x,p\},$ which are also compact. So the space is locally relatively compact (each point admits a local base of relatively compact neighborhoods) and locally compact in the sense that each point has a local base of compact neighborhoods. But points $x\ne p$ do not admit a local base of closed compact neighborhoods.

The space is ultraconnected, as any nonempty closed set contains the point $p.$ Therefore the space is also connected and path-connected.

== See also ==
- Finite topological space
- Fort space
- List of topologies
- Particular point topology
