= Kolmogorov space =

Concept in topology

Separation axioms in topological spaces

Kolmogorov classification
- T_{0}: (Kolmogorov)
- T_{1}: (Fréchet)
- T_{2}: (Hausdorff)
- T_{2½}: (Urysohn)
- completely T_{2}: (completely Hausdorff)
- T_{3}: (regular Hausdorff)
- T_{3½}: (Tychonoff)
- T_{4}: (normal Hausdorff)
- T_{5}: (completely normal Hausdorff)
- T_{6}: (perfectly normal Hausdorff)

In topology and related branches of mathematics, a topological space X is a T_{0} space or Kolmogorov space (named after Andrey Kolmogorov) if for every pair of distinct points of X, at least one of them has a neighborhood not containing the other. In a T_{0} space, all points are topologically distinguishable.

This condition, called the T_{0} condition, is the weakest of the separation axioms. Nearly all topological spaces normally studied in mathematics are T_{0} spaces. In particular, all T_{1} spaces, i.e., all spaces in which for every pair of distinct points, each has a neighborhood not containing the other, are T_{0} spaces. This includes all T_{2} (or Hausdorff) spaces, i.e., all topological spaces in which distinct points have disjoint neighbourhoods. In another direction, every sober space (which may not be T_{1}) is T_{0}; this includes the underlying topological space of any scheme. Given any topological space one can construct a T_{0} space by identifying topologically indistinguishable points.

T_{0} spaces that are not T_{1} spaces are exactly those spaces for which the specialization preorder is a nontrivial partial order. Such spaces naturally occur in computer science, specifically in denotational semantics.

== Definition ==
A T_{0} space is a topological space in which every pair of distinct points is topologically distinguishable. That is, for any two different points x and y there is an open set that contains one of these points and not the other. More precisely the topological space X is Kolmogorov or $\mathbf T_0$ if and only if:

If $a,b\in X$ and $a\neq b$, there exists an open set O such that either $(a\in O) \wedge (b\notin O)$ or $(a\notin O) \wedge (b\in O)$.

Topologically distinguishable points are automatically distinct. On the other hand, if the singleton sets {x} and {y} are separated then the points x and y must be topologically distinguishable. That is,

separated ⇒ topologically distinguishable ⇒ distinct

The property of being topologically distinguishable is, in general, stronger than being distinct but weaker than being separated. In a T_{0} space, the second arrow above also reverses; points are distinct if and only if they are distinguishable. This is how the T_{0} axiom fits in with the rest of the separation axioms.

== Examples and counter examples ==
Nearly all topological spaces normally studied in mathematics are T_{0}. In particular, all Hausdorff (T_{2}) spaces, T_{1} spaces and sober spaces are T_{0}.

=== Spaces that are not T_{0} ===
- A set with more than one element, with the trivial topology. No points are distinguishable.
- The set R^{2} where the open sets are the Cartesian product of an open set in R and R itself, i.e., the product topology of R with the usual topology and R with the trivial topology; points (a,b) and (a,c) are not distinguishable.
- The space of all measurable functions f from the real line R to the complex plane C such that the Lebesgue integral $\left(\int_{\mathbb{R}} |f(x)|^2 \,dx\right)^{\frac{1}{2}} < \infty$. Two functions which are equal almost everywhere are indistinguishable. See also below.

=== Spaces that are T_{0} but not T_{1} ===
- The Zariski topology on Spec(R), the prime spectrum of a commutative ring R, is always T_{0} but generally not T_{1}. The non-closed points correspond to prime ideals which are not maximal. They are important to the understanding of schemes.
- The particular point topology on any set with at least two elements is T_{0} but not T_{1} since the particular point is not closed (its closure is the whole space). An important special case is the Sierpiński space which is the particular point topology on the set {0,1}.
- The excluded point topology on any set with at least two elements is T_{0} but not T_{1}. The only closed point is the excluded point.
- The Alexandrov topology on a partially ordered set is T_{0} but will not be T_{1} unless the order is discrete (agrees with equality). Every finite T_{0} space is of this type. This also includes the particular point and excluded point topologies as special cases.
- The right order topology on a totally ordered set is a related example.
- The overlapping interval topology is similar to the particular point topology since every non-empty open set includes 0.
- Quite generally, a topological space X will be T_{0} if and only if the specialization preorder on X is a partial order. However, X will be T_{1} if and only if the order is discrete (i.e. agrees with equality). So a space will be T_{0} but not T_{1} if and only if the specialization preorder on X is a non-discrete partial order.

== Operating with T_{0} spaces ==
Commonly studied topological spaces are all T_{0}. Indeed, when mathematicians in many fields, notably analysis, naturally run across non-T_{0} spaces, they usually replace them with T_{0} spaces, in a manner to be described below. To motivate the ideas involved, consider a well-known example. The space L^{2}(R) is meant to be the space of all measurable functions f from the real line R to the complex plane C such that the Lebesgue integral of |f(x)|^{2} over the entire real line is finite. This space should become a normed vector space by defining the norm ||f|| to be the square root of that integral. The problem is that this is not really a norm, only a seminorm, because there are functions other than the zero function whose (semi)norms are zero. The standard solution is to define L^{2}(R) to be a set of equivalence classes of functions instead of a set of functions directly. This constructs a quotient space of the original seminormed vector space, and this quotient is a normed vector space. It inherits several convenient properties from the seminormed space; see below.

In general, when dealing with a fixed topology T on a set X, it is helpful if that topology is T_{0}. On the other hand, when X is fixed but T is allowed to vary within certain boundaries, to force T to be T_{0} may be inconvenient, since non-T_{0} topologies are often important special cases. Thus, it can be important to understand both T_{0} and non-T_{0} versions of the various conditions that can be placed on a topological space.

== The Kolmogorov quotient ==
Topological indistinguishability of points is an equivalence relation. No matter what topological space X might be to begin with, the quotient space under this equivalence relation is always T_{0}. This quotient space is called the Kolmogorov quotient of X, which we will denote KQ(X). Of course, if X was T_{0} to begin with, then KQ(X) and X are naturally homeomorphic. Categorically, Kolmogorov spaces are a reflective subcategory of topological spaces, and the Kolmogorov quotient is the reflector.

Topological spaces X and Y are Kolmogorov equivalent when their Kolmogorov quotients are homeomorphic. Many properties of topological spaces are preserved by this equivalence; that is, if X and Y are Kolmogorov equivalent, then X has such a property if and only if Y does. On the other hand, most of the other properties of topological spaces imply T_{0}-ness; that is, if X has such a property, then X must be T_{0}. Only a few properties, such as being an indiscrete space, are exceptions to this rule of thumb. Even better, many structures defined on topological spaces can be transferred between X and KQ(X). The result is that, if you have a non-T_{0} topological space with a certain structure or property, then you can usually form a T_{0} space with the same structures and properties by taking the Kolmogorov quotient.

The example of L^{2}(R) displays these features. From the point of view of topology, the seminormed vector space that we started with has a lot of extra structure; for example, it is a vector space, and it has a seminorm, and these define a pseudometric and a uniform structure that are compatible with the topology. Also, there are several properties of these structures; for example, the seminorm satisfies the parallelogram identity and the uniform structure is complete. The space is not T_{0} since any two functions in L^{2}(R) that are equal almost everywhere are indistinguishable with this topology. When we form the Kolmogorov quotient, the actual L^{2}(R), these structures and properties are preserved. Thus, L^{2}(R) is also a complete seminormed vector space satisfying the parallelogram identity. But we actually get a bit more, since the space is now T_{0}. A seminorm is a norm if and only if the underlying topology is T_{0}, so L^{2}(R) is actually a complete normed vector space satisfying the parallelogram identity—otherwise known as a Hilbert space. And it is a Hilbert space that mathematicians (and physicists, in quantum mechanics) generally want to study. The notation L^{2}(R) usually denotes the Kolmogorov quotient, the set of equivalence classes of square integrable functions that differ on sets of measure zero, rather than simply the vector space of square integrable functions that the notation suggests.

== Removing T_{0} ==
Although norms were historically defined first, people came up with the definition of seminorm as well, which is a sort of non-T_{0} version of a norm. In general, it is possible to define non-T_{0} versions of both properties and structures of topological spaces. First, consider a property of topological spaces, such as being Hausdorff. One can then define another property of topological spaces by defining the space X to satisfy the property if and only if the Kolmogorov quotient KQ(X) is Hausdorff. This is a sensible, albeit less famous, property; in this case, such a space X is called preregular. (There even turns out to be a more direct definition of preregularity). Now consider a structure that can be placed on topological spaces, such as a metric. We can define a new structure on topological spaces by letting an example of the structure on X be simply a metric on KQ(X). This is a sensible structure on X; it is a pseudometric. (Again, there is a more direct definition of pseudometric.)

In this way, there is a natural way to remove T_{0}-ness from the requirements for a property or structure. It is generally easier to study spaces that are T_{0}, but it may also be easier to allow structures that aren't T_{0} to get a fuller picture. The T_{0} requirement can be added or removed arbitrarily using the concept of Kolmogorov quotient.

== See also ==
- Sober space
