= J. Arthur Seebach Jr. =

American mathematician

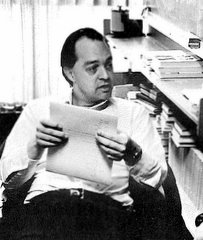
J. Arthur Seebach, Jr. working with a student in his St. Olaf College Math Department Office. Photo from the 1986 St. Olaf College Yearbook.

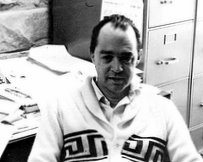
J. Arthur Seebach, Jr. in his St. Olaf College Math Department Office. Photo from the 1987 St. Olaf College Yearbook.

J. Arthur Seebach Jr (May 17, 1938 – December 3, 1996) was an American mathematician.

Seebach studied Greek language as an undergraduate, making it a second major with mathematics.

Seebach studied with A. I. Weinzweig at Northwestern University. He earned a Ph.D. with the thesis Cones and Homotopy in Categories. Seebach began to teach at Saint Olaf College in Northfield, Minnesota in 1965. He, his wife Linda A. Seebach, and Lynn A. Steen wrote an expository article "What is a Sheaf". The paper showed that a sheaf is useful in analysis, algebra, and geometry when considering germs of holomorphic functions, local rings, and differential forms. J. Arthur also wrote "Injectives and Homotopy".

In 1971 Seebach and Steen took over the Book Reviews section of American Mathematical Monthly, including Telegraphic Reviews which ran for several pages every month. The massive effort was eventually distributed over some 50 mathematicians at Saint Olaf, Carleton, and Macalester Colleges. Telegraphic Reviews, in telegraphic style, was started by Kenneth O. May in 1965 and provided an American posting of new publications before the digital age.

Seebach and Steen conducted research in a 1967 summer school with students investigating the independence of conditions on topological spaces. They summarized their work in Counterexamples in Topology (1978).

In 1975 Seebach and Steen became co-editors of Mathematics Magazine. Steen wrote:

Arthur’s sense of whimsy, his love of puns, and his proclivity for obscure connections totally transformed the image of Mathematics Magazine. Cover art, viewed as radical at the time, has since been emulated...

Seebach welcomed the rise of computers when he assembled a Heathkit H8. In 1986 he became editor of Mathematical Notes in American Mathematical Monthly.

Beyond mathematics, Seebach sang with the Bach Society of Minnesota. The craftsmanship of the Studebaker automobile appealed to Seebach and he operated a side-business in Studebaker parts, driving some, and publishing a newsletter for fellow aficionados of the car. His newsletter experience was of value to Mathematical Association of America when they began their own newsletter.

Seebach died in 1996 from complications of diabetes.
