= Separation axiom =

Axioms in topology defining notions of "separation"

Separation axioms in topological spaces

Kolmogorov classification
- T_{0}: Kolmogorov
- T_{1}: Fréchet
- T_{2}: Hausdorff
- T_{2½}: Urysohn
- completely T_{2}: completely Hausdorff
- T_{3}: regular Hausdorff
- T_{3½}: Tychonoff
- T_{4}: normal Hausdorff
- T_{5}: completely normal Hausdorff
- T_{6}: perfectly normal Hausdorff

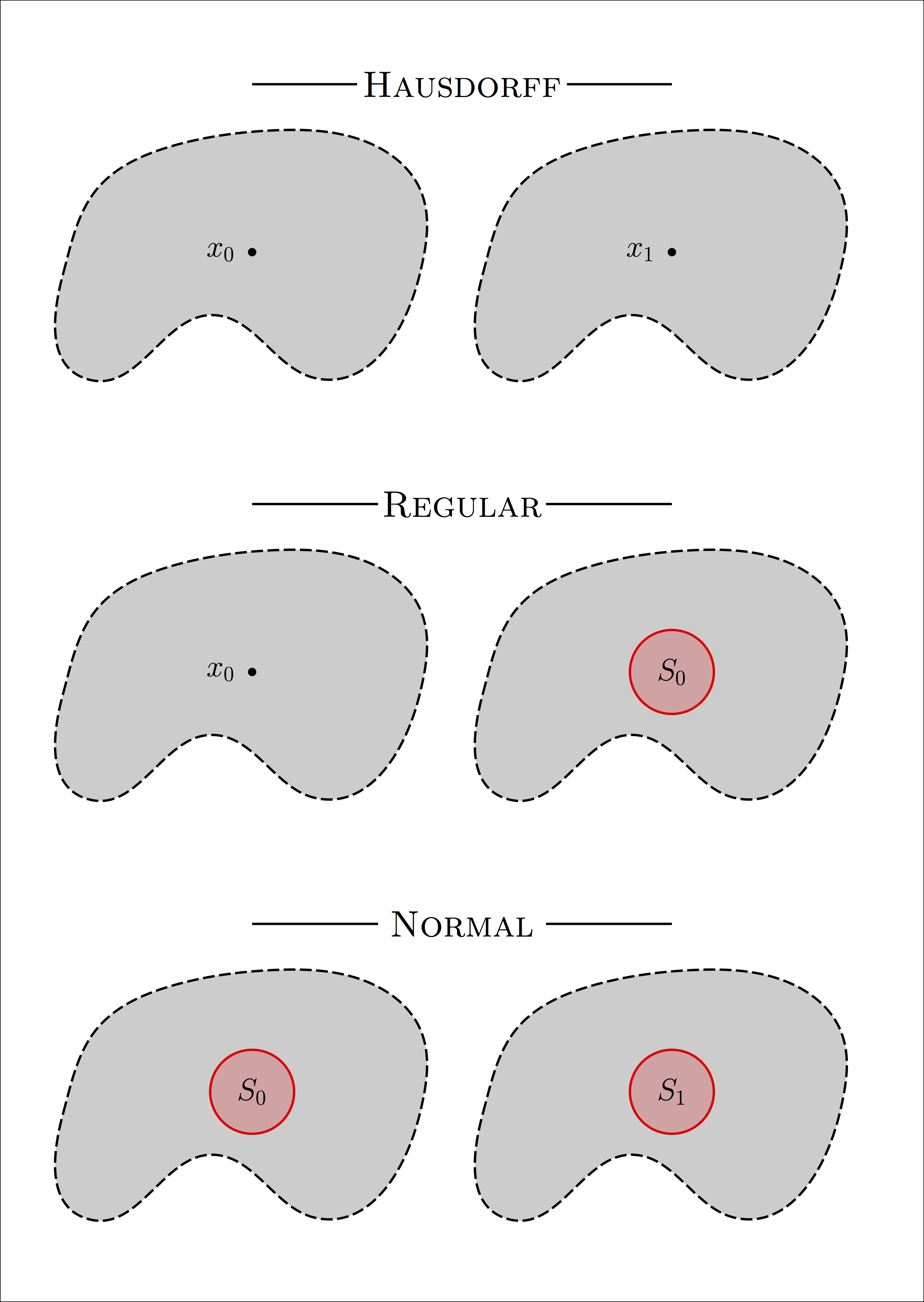
An illustration of some of the separation axioms. Grey amorphous broken-outline regions indicate open neighbourhoods of disjoint closed sets or points: red solid-outline circles denote closed sets while black dots represent points.

In topology and related fields of mathematics, there are several restrictions that one often makes on the kinds of topological spaces that one wishes to consider. Some of these restrictions are given by the separation axioms. These are sometimes called Tychonoff separation axioms, after Andrey Tychonoff.

The separation axioms are not fundamental axioms like those of set theory, but rather defining properties which may be specified to distinguish certain types of topological spaces. The separation axioms are denoted with the letter "T" after the German Trennungsaxiom ("separation axiom"), and increasing numerical subscripts denote stronger and stronger properties.

The precise definitions of the separation axioms have varied over time. Especially in older literature, different authors might have different definitions of each condition.

== Preliminary definitions ==
Before we define the separation axioms themselves, we give concrete meaning to the concept of separated sets (and points) in topological spaces. (Separated sets are not the same as separated spaces, defined in the next section.)

The separation axioms are about the use of topological means to distinguish disjoint sets and distinct points. It's not enough for elements of a topological space to be distinct (that is, unequal); we may want them to be topologically distinguishable. Similarly, it's not enough for subsets of a topological space to be disjoint; we may want them to be separated (in any of various ways). The separation axioms all say, in one way or another, that points or sets that are distinguishable or separated in some weak sense must also be distinguishable or separated in some stronger sense.

Let X be a topological space. Then two points x and y in X are topologically distinguishable if they do not have exactly the same neighbourhoods (or equivalently the same open neighbourhoods); that is, at least one of them has a neighbourhood that is not a neighbourhood of the other (or equivalently there is an open set that one point belongs to but the other point does not). That is, at least one of the points does not belong to the other's closure.

Two points x and y are separated if each of them has a neighbourhood that is not a neighbourhood of the other; that is, neither belongs to the other's closure. More generally, two subsets A and B of X are separated if each is disjoint from the other's closure, though the closures themselves do not have to be disjoint. Equivalently, each subset is included in an open set disjoint from the other subset. All of the remaining conditions for separation of sets may also be applied to points (or to a point and a set) by using singleton sets. Points x and y will be considered separated, by neighbourhoods, by closed neighbourhoods, by a continuous function, precisely by a function, if and only if their singleton sets {x} and {y} are separated according to the corresponding criterion.

Subsets A and B are separated by neighbourhoods if they have disjoint neighbourhoods. They are separated by closed neighbourhoods if they have disjoint closed neighbourhoods. They are separated by a continuous function (or completely separated) if there exists a continuous function f from the space X to the real line R such that A is a subset of the preimage f ^{−1}({0}) and B is a subset of the preimage f ^{−1}({1}). Finally, they are precisely separated by a continuous function if there exists a continuous function f from X to R such that A equals the preimage f ^{−1}({0}) and B equals f ^{−1}({1}).

These conditions are given in order of increasing strength: Any two topologically distinguishable points must be distinct, and any two separated points must be topologically distinguishable. Any two separated sets must be disjoint, any two sets separated by neighbourhoods must be separated, and so on.

== Main definitions ==
These definitions all use essentially the preliminary definitions above.

Many of these names have alternative meanings in some of mathematical literature; for example, the meanings of "normal" and "T_{4}" are sometimes interchanged, similarly "regular" and "T_{3}", etc. Many of the concepts also have several names; however, the one listed first is always least likely to be ambiguous.

Most of these axioms have alternative definitions with the same meaning; the definitions given here fall into a consistent pattern that relates the various notions of separation defined in the previous section. Other possible definitions can be found in the individual articles.

In all of the following definitions, X is again a topological space.

- X is T_{0}, or Kolmogorov, if any two distinct points in X are topologically distinguishable. (It will be a common theme among the separation axioms to have one version of an axiom that requires T_{0} and one version that doesn't.)
- X is R_{0}, or symmetric, if any two topologically distinguishable points in X are separated.
- X is T_{1}, or accessible or Fréchet, if any two distinct points in X are separated. Equivalently, every single-point set is a closed set. Thus, X is T_{1} if and only if it is both T_{0} and R_{0}. (Although one may say such things as "T_{1} space", "Fréchet topology", and "suppose that the topological space X is Fréchet"; one should avoid saying "Fréchet space" in this context, since there is another entirely different notion of Fréchet space in functional analysis.)
- X is R_{1}, or preregular, if any two topologically distinguishable points in X are separated by neighbourhoods. Every R_{1} space is also R_{0}.
- X is Hausdorff, or T_{2} or separated, if any two distinct points in X are separated by neighbourhoods. Thus, X is Hausdorff if and only if it is both T_{0} and R_{1}. Every Hausdorff space is also T_{1}.
- X is T_{2½}, or Urysohn, if any two distinct points in X are separated by closed neighbourhoods. Every T_{2½} space is also Hausdorff.
- X is completely Hausdorff, or completely T_{2}, if any two distinct points in X are separated by a continuous function. Every completely Hausdorff space is also T_{2½}.
- X is regular if, given any point x and closed set F in X such that x does not belong to F, they are separated by neighbourhoods. (In fact, in a regular space, any such x and F will also be separated by closed neighbourhoods.) Every regular space is also R_{1}.
- X is regular Hausdorff, or T_{3}, if it is both T_{0} and regular. Every regular Hausdorff space is also T_{2½}.
- X is completely regular if, given any point x and closed set F in X such that x does not belong to F, they are separated by a continuous function. Every completely regular space is also regular.
- X is Tychonoff, or T_{3½}, completely T_{3}, or completely regular Hausdorff, if it is both T_{0} and completely regular. Every Tychonoff space is both regular Hausdorff and completely Hausdorff.
- X is normal if any two disjoint closed subsets of X are separated by neighbourhoods. (In fact, a space is normal if and only if any two disjoint closed sets can be separated by a continuous function; this is Urysohn's lemma.)
- X is normal regular if it is both R_{0} and normal. Every normal regular space is also completely regular.
- X is normal Hausdorff, or T_{4}, if it is both T_{1} and normal. Every normal Hausdorff space is also both Tychonoff and normal regular.
- X is completely normal if any two separated sets are separated by neighbourhoods. Every completely normal space is also normal.
- X is completely normal Hausdorff, or T_{5} or completely T_{4}, if it is both completely normal and T_{1}. Every completely normal Hausdorff space is also normal Hausdorff.
- X is perfectly normal if any two disjoint closed sets are precisely separated by a continuous function. Every perfectly normal space is also both completely normal and completely regular.
- X is perfectly normal Hausdorff, or T_{6} or perfectly T_{4}, if it is both perfectly normal and T_{0}. Every perfectly normal Hausdorff space is also completely normal Hausdorff.

The following table summarizes the separation axioms as well as the implications between them: cells which are merged represent equivalent properties, each axiom implies the ones in the cells to its left, and if we assume the T_{1} axiom, then each axiom also implies the ones in the cells above it (for example, all normal T_{1} spaces are also completely regular).

	Separated	Separated by neighborhoods	Separated by closed neighborhoods	Separated by function	Precisely separated by function
Distinguishable points	Symmetric	Preregular			
Distinct points	Fréchet	Hausdorff	Urysohn	Completely Hausdorff	Perfectly Hausdorff
Closed set and point outside	Symmetric	Regular		Completely regular	Perfectly normal
Disjoint closed sets	always	Normal			Perfectly normal
Separated sets	always	Completely normal			discrete space

== Relationships between the axioms ==
The T_{0} axiom is special in that it can not only be added to a property (so that completely regular plus T_{0} is Tychonoff) but also be subtracted from a property (so that Hausdorff minus T_{0} is R_{1}), in a fairly precise sense; see Kolmogorov quotient for more information. When applied to the separation axioms, this leads to the relationships in the table to the left below. In this table, one goes from the right side to the left side by adding the requirement of T_{0}, and one goes from the left side to the right side by removing that requirement, using the Kolmogorov quotient operation. (The names in parentheses given on the left side of this table are generally ambiguous or at least less well known; but they are used in the diagram below.)

Hasse diagram of the separation axioms.

T_{0} version	Non-T_{0} version
T_{0}	(No requirement)
T_{1}	R_{0}
Hausdorff (T_{2})	R_{1}
T_{2½}	(No special name)
Completely Hausdorff	(No special name)
Regular Hausdorff (T_{3})	Regular
Tychonoff (T_{3½})	Completely regular
Normal T_{0}	Normal
Normal Hausdorff (T_{4})	Normal regular
Completely normal T_{0}	Completely normal
Completely normal Hausdorff (T_{5})	Completely normal regular
Perfectly normal Hausdorff (T_{6})	Perfectly normal

Other than the inclusion or exclusion of T_{0}, the relationships between the separation axioms are indicated in the diagram to the right. In this diagram, the non-T_{0} version of a condition is on the left side of the slash, and the T_{0} version is on the right side. Letters are used for abbreviation as follows: "P" = "perfectly", "C" = "completely", "N" = "normal", and "R" (without a subscript) = "regular". A bullet indicates that there is no special name for a space at that spot. The dash at the bottom indicates no condition.

Two properties may be combined using this diagram by following the diagram upwards until both branches meet. For example, if a space is both completely normal ("CN") and completely Hausdorff ("CT_{2}"), then following both branches up, one finds the spot "•/T_{5}". Since completely Hausdorff spaces are T_{0} (even though completely normal spaces may not be), one takes the T_{0} side of the slash, so a completely normal completely Hausdorff space is the same as a T_{5} space (less ambiguously known as a completely normal Hausdorff space, as can be seen in the table above).

As can be seen from the diagram, normal and R_{0} together imply a host of other properties, since combining the two properties leads through the many nodes on the right-side branch. Since regularity is the most well known of these, spaces that are both normal and R_{0} are typically called "normal regular spaces". In a somewhat similar fashion, spaces that are both normal and T_{1} are often called "normal Hausdorff spaces" by people that wish to avoid the ambiguous "T" notation. These conventions can be generalised to other regular spaces and Hausdorff spaces.

== Other separation axioms ==
There are some other conditions on topological spaces that are sometimes classified with the separation axioms, but these don't fit in with the usual separation axioms as completely. Other than their definitions, they aren't discussed here; see their individual articles.

- X is sober if, for every nonempty closed set C that is not the union of two of its closed proper subsets, there is a unique point p such that the closure of {p} equals C. More briefly, every irreducible closed set has a unique generic point. Any Hausdorff space must be sober, and any sober space must be T_{0}.
- X is weak Hausdorff if, for every continuous map f to X from a compact Hausdorff space, the image of f is closed in X. Any Hausdorff space must be weak Hausdorff, and any weak Hausdorff space must be T_{1}.
- X is a KC space if all compact subsets of X are closed. The KC space property is strictly between T_{1} and T_{2} (Hausdorff) in strength. (Note: A KC space is necessarily T_{1} because every single-point set is necessarily compact and thus closed, but the reverse is not necessarily true; for the cofinite topology on infinitely many points, which is T_{1}, every subset is compact but not every subset is closed.) (Note: Every T_{2} (Hausdorff) space is a KC space, but the reverse is not necessarily true; for the cocountable topology on uncountably many points, the compact sets are all finite and hence all closed but the space is not T_{2} (Hausdorff).) The KC space property is strictly stronger than the weak Hausdorff space property. (Note: The image of a continuous map from a compact Hausdorff space is necessarily compact; in a KC space this means that it is also closed.)
- X is semiregular if the regular open sets form a base for the open sets of X. Any regular space must also be semiregular.
- X is quasi-regular if for any nonempty open set G, there is a nonempty open set H such that the closure of H is contained in G.
- X is fully normal if every open cover has an open star refinement. X is fully T_{4}, or fully normal Hausdorff, if it is both T_{1} and fully normal. Every fully normal space is normal and every fully T_{4} space is T_{4}. Moreover, one can show that every fully T_{4} space is paracompact. In fact, fully normal spaces actually have more to do with paracompactness than with the usual separation axioms.

== See also ==
- General topology
