= Lynn Steen =

American mathematician (1941–2015)

- Born: January 1, 1941; Chicago, Illinois
- Died: June 21, 2015 (aged 74); Minneapolis, Minnesota
- Education: Undergraduate University: Luther College (Iowa) B.A. Mathematics Graduate University: Massachusetts Institute of Technology MIT Ph.D Mathematics
- Occupation: Professor Emeritus of Mathematics
- Spouse: Mary E. Steen
- Children: Margaret and Catherine

Lynn Arthur Steen (January 1, 1941 – June 21, 2015) was an American mathematician who was a professor of mathematics at St. Olaf College, Northfield, Minnesota, in the U.S. He wrote numerous books and articles on the teaching of mathematics. He was a past president of the Mathematics Association of America (MAA) and served as chairman of the Conference Board of the Mathematical Sciences.

== Biography ==
Steen was born in Chicago, Illinois, but was raised in Staten Island, New York. His mother was a singer at the N.Y. City Center Opera and his father conducted the Wagner College Choir. In 1961, Steen graduated from Luther College with a degree in mathematics and a minor in physics. In 1965 Steen graduated from MIT with a Ph.D. in mathematics. He then joined the faculty of St. Olaf College.

At the beginning of Steen's career, he mainly focused on teaching and helping develop research experiences for undergraduates. His teaching led Steen to begin to investigate the links between mathematics and other fields. He wrote many articles aimed for a non-mathematical audience about new developments in mathematics. The majority of his work in the 1970s was regarding mathematical exposition, communicating mathematical research to students, teachers, and the public.

In the 1980s, Steen helped lead national efforts to modernize the teaching of calculus and other areas in undergraduate mathematics. He helped broaden the mathematics major at St. Olaf by focusing the students work on inquiry and investigation. With the help of his mathematical colleagues, Steen made mathematics one of the five top majors for St. Olaf. St Olaf also became one of the nation's largest undergraduate producers in mathematical sciences.

In 1992, Steen went on leave from St. Olaf, he served as executive director of the Mathematical Sciences Education Board at the National Academy of Sciences in Washington, DC. In 1995, he returned to St. Olaf and began working on special projects for the Provost office. In the late 1990s, Steen worked as a writer and editor in pioneering grade-by-grade standards that helped meet the mathematical requirements of college as well as careers. The campaign for similar standards that is seen nowadays is an evolution of his former efforts.

In 2009 Steen retired from St. Olaf. He died June 21, 2015, of heart failure. He was survived by his wife of 52 years, Mary Steen.

== Publications ==
- '"The 'Gift' of Mathematics in the Era of Biology."' Math and Bio 2010: Linking Undergraduate Disciplines, Mathematical Association of America, 2005, pp. 13–25.
- "Mathematics and Biology: New Challenges for Both Disciplines." The Chronicle Review, 4 March 2005, p. B12.
- "Analysis 2000: Challenges and Opportunities." One Hundred Years of L'Enseignement Mathématique: Moments of Mathematics Education in the Twentieth Century, Daniel Coray et al., editors. Genéve: L'Enseignement Mathématique 2003, pp. 191–211.
- "A Mind for Math." Review of The Math Gene: How Mathematical Thinking Evolved and Why Numbers are Like Gossip, by Keith Devlin. American Scientist, 88 (Nov.-Dec. 2000) 555–556. [HTML Version.]
- "A Joyful Passion for Proofs: The Pied Piper of Mathematics." Review of The Man Who Loved Only Numbers: The Story of Paul Erdős and the Search for Mathematical Truth, by Paul Hoffman, Hyperion Press, 1998. American Journal of Psychology, Fall 2000, pp. 478–483.
- "Review" of A Mathematical Mystery Tour: Discovering the Truth and Beauty of the Cosmos, by A. K. Dewdney. Notices of the American Mathematical Society 47:2 (February 2000) 221–224.[Alternate Source.]
- "Facing the Future: Mathematics for Everyone." Proceedings of ICMI-China Regional Conference on Mathematical Education, Beijing, 1991.
- "Pattern." On the Shoulders of Giants: New Approaches to Numeracy, National Academy Press, 1990 pp. 1–10.
- "Election Mathematics: Do All Those Numbers Mean What They Say?" in Readings in Public Sector Economics, Samuel Baker and Catherine Elliott, editors. D.C. Heath, 1989, pp. 308–315.
- "Celebrating Mathematics," American Mathematical Monthly 95 (May 1988) 414–427.
- "The Science of Patterns," Science 240 (29 April 1988) 611–616.
- "Ever Since Socrates. "Review of The Beauty of Doing Mathematics: Three Public Dialogues and Math! Encounters with High School Students, by Serge Lang. American Scientist, May–June 1986 pp. 284-285.
- "Living with a New Mathematical Species." The Influence of Computers on Informatics and Its Teaching, A.G. Howson and J.-P. Kahane, editors. Cambridge University Press, 1986, pp. 52–60.
- "Mathematics: Our Invisible Culture," SCAN, (Newsletter of the Council for Liberal Learning of Association of American Colleges), 1:4 (Feb.-Mar. 1986) 3–4.
- "Interview with Peter J. Hilton" (with Gerald Alexanderson), Mathematical People: Profiles and Interviews, Birkhauser Boston, 1985, pp. 133–149.
- "Euler Glossary" editor, Mathematics Magazine 56 (1983) 316–325.
- "John G. Kemeny: Computing Pioneer," The Two Year College Mathematics Journal 14 (1983) 18–35.
- "Nonstandard Analysis," Encyclopædia Britannica Micopaedia, Second Edition, 1982.
- "Twisting and Turning in Space," Science News 122 (17 July 1982) 42–44.
- "The Arithmetic of Apportionment," Science News 121 (8 May 1982) 317–318.
- "A Conversation with Don Knuth" (with Donald J. Albers). The Two Year College Mathematics Journal 13 (1982) 2-18, 128–141.
- "Computer Calculus." Science News 119 (18 April 1981) 250–251.
- Mathematics Tomorrow, editor, Springer-Verlag, 1981.
- "From Counting Votes to Making Votes Count: The Mathematics of Elections," Scientific American 243 (October 1980) 16-26B.
- "Linear Programming: A Solid New Algorithm." Science News (6 Oct. 1979) 234-236.
- "Unsolved Problems in Geometry," The Mathematics Teacher 73 (1980) 366–369.
- "A New Perspective on Infinity." New Scientist (9 Nov. 1978) 448-451.
- Mathematics Today: Twelve Informal Essays, (Editor), Springer-Verlag, 1978.
- "Fractals: A World of Nonintegral Dimensions." Science News 112 (20 August 1977) pp. 122–123.
- "Catastrophe Theory: The First Decade," Science News 111 (2 April 1977) 218–219, 223.
- "Solution of the Four Color Problem," Mathematics Magazine 49 (1976) 219–222.
- "Solving the Great Bubble Mystery." Science News 108 (20 Sept. 1975) 186-187.
- "Foundations of Mathematics: Unsolvable Problems," Science (18 July 1975) 209–210.
- "The Metamathematical World of Model Theory," Science News 107 (15 Feb. 1975) 108–111.
- "Highlights in the History of Spectral Theory," American Mathematical Monthly 80 (1973) 359-381.
- "Conjectures and Counterexamples in Metrization Theory," American Mathematical Monthly 79 (1972) 113–132.
- "New Models of the Real-Number Line," Scientific American 224 (1971) 92–99.
- Lynn Arthur Steen and J. Arthur Seebach, Jr., Counterexamples in Topology, (1978) Dover Publications, ISBN 0-486-68735-X.
- On the Shoulders of Giants: New Approaches to Numeracy, Authors Mathematical Sciences Education Board, Lynn Arthur Steen, National Research Council, Editor Lynn Arthur Steen, Publisher National Academies Press, 1990 ISBN 0-309-08449-0

== Awards and degrees ==
- 2012 - Fellow of the American Mathematical Society
- 1999 - Award of Appreciation, American Mathematical Society of Two Year Colleges (AMATYC).
- 1996 - Sc. D., honoris causa, Concordia College (MN), Wittenberg University, Ohio (1991), Luther College, Iowa (1986).
- 1992 - Award for Distinguished Service, The Mathematical Association of America.
- 1989 - Board of Directors Special Award, Sigma Xi, The Scientific Research Society
- 1985 - Elected to Phi Beta Kappa.
- 1982 - Elected Fellow of the American Association for the Advancement of Science (AAAS).
- 1973 - Lester R. Ford Awards for Expository Writing, The Mathematical Association of America (1973, 1975).
- 1960 - National Science Foundation Science Faculty Fellowship, Institute Mittag-Leffler, Djursholm, Sweden.
- 1965 - Ph.D. Massachusetts Institute of Technology. (Field: Mathematics.)
- 1961 - Danforth (1961–65), Woodrow Wilson (1961–62), and National Science Foundation Graduate Fellowships.
- 1961 - B.A., Luther College, Decorah, Iowa. (Majors: Mathematics, Physics; Minor: Philosophy.)
