= T1 space =

Topological space in which all singleton sets are closed

Separation axioms in topological spaces

Kolmogorov classification
- T_{0}: (Kolmogorov)
- T_{1}: (Fréchet)
- T_{2}: (Hausdorff)
- T_{2½}: (Urysohn)
- completely T_{2}: (completely Hausdorff)
- T_{3}: (regular Hausdorff)
- T_{3½}: (Tychonoff)
- T_{4}: (normal Hausdorff)
- T_{5}: (completely normal Hausdorff)
- T_{6}: (perfectly normal Hausdorff)

In topology and related branches of mathematics, a T_{1} space is a topological space in which, for every pair of distinct points, each has a neighborhood not containing the other point. An R_{0} space is one in which this holds for every pair of topologically distinguishable points. The properties T_{1} and R_{0} are examples of separation axioms.

== Definitions ==
Let X be a topological space and let x and y be points in X. We say that x and y are separated if each lies in a neighbourhood that does not contain the other point.

- X is called a T_{1} space if any two distinct points in X are separated.
- X is called an R_{0} space if any two topologically distinguishable points in X are separated.

A T_{1} space is also called an accessible space or a space with Fréchet topology and an R_{0} space is also called a symmetric space. (The term Fréchet space also has an entirely different meaning in functional analysis. For this reason, the term T_{1} space is preferred. There is also a notion of a Fréchet–Urysohn space as a type of sequential space. The term symmetric space also has another meaning.)

A topological space is a T_{1} space if and only if it is both an R_{0} space and a Kolmogorov (or T_{0}) space (i.e., a space in which distinct points are topologically distinguishable). A topological space is an R_{0} space if and only if its Kolmogorov quotient is a T_{1} space.

== Properties ==
If $X$ is a topological space then the following conditions are equivalent:

1. $X$ is a T_{1} space.
2. $X$ is a T_{0} space and an R_{0} space.
3. Points are closed in $X$; that is, for every point $x \in X,$ the singleton set $\{x\}$ is a closed subset of $X.$
4. Every subset of $X$ is the intersection of all the open sets containing it.
5. Every finite set is closed.
6. Every cofinite set of $X$ is open.
7. For every $x \in X,$ the fixed ultrafilter at $x$ converges only to $x.$
8. For every subset $S$ of $X$ and every point $x \in X,$ $x$ is a limit point of $S$ if and only if every open neighbourhood of $x$ contains infinitely many points of $S.$
9. Each map from the Sierpiński space to $X$ is trivial.
10. The map from the Sierpiński space to the single point has the lifting property with respect to the map from $X$ to the single point.

If $X$ is a topological space then the following conditions are equivalent: (where $\operatorname{cl}\{x\}$ denotes the closure of $\{x\}$)

1. $X$ is an R_{0} space.
2. Given any $x \in X,$ the closure of $\{x\}$ contains only the points that are topologically indistinguishable from $x.$
3. The Kolmogorov quotient of $X$ is T_{1}.
4. For any $x,y\in X,$ $x$ is in the closure of $\{y\}$ if and only if $y$ is in the closure of $\{x\}.$
5. The specialization preorder on $X$ is symmetric (and therefore an equivalence relation).
6. The sets $\operatorname{cl}\{x\}$ for $x\in X$ form a partition of $X$ (that is, any two such sets are either identical or disjoint).
7. If $F$ is a closed set and $x$ is a point not in $F$, then $F\cap\operatorname{cl}\{x\}=\emptyset.$
8. Every neighbourhood of a point $x\in X$ contains $\operatorname{cl}\{x\}.$
9. Every open set is a union of closed sets.
10. For every $x \in X,$ the fixed ultrafilter at $x$ converges only to the points that are topologically indistinguishable from $x.$

In any topological space we have, as properties of any two points, the following implications

$$\text{separated}\implies\text{topologically distinguishable}\implies\text{distinct.}$$

If the first arrow can be reversed the space is R_{0}. If the second arrow can be reversed the space is T_{0}. If the composite arrow can be reversed the space is T_{1}. A space is T_{1} if and only if it is both R_{0} and T_{0}.

A finite T_{1} space is necessarily discrete (since every set is closed).

A space that is locally T_{1}, in the sense that each point has a T_{1} neighbourhood (when given the subspace topology), is also T_{1}. Similarly, a space that is locally R_{0} is also R_{0}. In contrast, the corresponding statement does not hold for T_{2} spaces. For example, the line with two origins is not a Hausdorff space but is locally Hausdorff.

== Examples ==
- Sierpiński space is a simple example of a topology that is T_{0} but is not T_{1}, and hence also not R_{0}.
- The overlapping interval topology is a simple example of a topology that is T_{0} but is not T_{1}.
- Every weakly Hausdorff space is T_{1} but the converse is not true in general.
- The cofinite topology on an infinite set is a simple example of a topology that is T_{1} but is not Hausdorff (T_{2}). This follows since no two nonempty open sets of the cofinite topology are disjoint. Specifically, let $X$ be the set of integers, and define the open sets $O_A$ to be those subsets of $X$ that contain all but a finite subset $A$ of $X.$ Then given distinct integers $x$ and $y$:

- the open set $O_{\{ x \}}$ contains $y$ but not $x,$ and the open set $O_{\{ y \}}$ contains $x$ and not $y$;
- equivalently, every singleton set $\{ x \}$ is the complement of the open set $O_{\{ x \}},$ so it is a closed set;
so the resulting space is T_{1} by each of the definitions above. This space is not T_{2}, because the intersection of any two open sets $O_A$ and $O_B$ is $O_A \cap O_B = O_{A \cup B},$ which is never empty. Alternatively, the set of even integers is compact but not closed, which would be impossible in a Hausdorff space.

- The above example can be modified slightly to create the double-pointed cofinite topology, which is an example of an R_{0} space that is neither T_{1} nor R_{1}. Let $X$ be the set of integers again, and using the definition of $O_A$ from the previous example, define a subbase of open sets $G_x$ for any integer $x$ to be $G_x = O_{\{ x, x+1 \}}$ if $x$ is an even number, and $G_x = O_{\{ x-1, x \}}$ if $x$ is odd. Then the basis of the topology are given by finite intersections of the subbasic sets: given a finite set $A,$the open sets of $X$ are

$$U_A := \bigcap_{x \in A} G_x.$$

The resulting space is not T_{0} (and hence not T_{1}), because the points $x$ and $x + 1$ (for $x$ even) are topologically indistinguishable; but otherwise it is essentially equivalent to the previous example.

- The Zariski topology on an algebraic variety (over an algebraically closed field) is T_{1}. To see this, note that the singleton containing a point with local coordinates $\left(c_1, \ldots, c_n\right)$ is the zero set of the polynomials $x_1 - c_1, \ldots, x_n - c_n.$ Thus, the point is closed. However, this example is well known as a space that is not Hausdorff (T_{2}). The Zariski topology is essentially an example of a cofinite topology.
- The Zariski topology on a commutative ring (that is, the prime spectrum of a ring) is T_{0} but not, in general, T_{1}. To see this, note that the closure of a one-point set is the set of all prime ideals that contain the point (and thus the topology is T_{0}). However, this closure is a maximal ideal, and the only closed points are the maximal ideals, and are thus not contained in any of the open sets of the topology, and thus the space does not satisfy axiom T_{1}. To be clear about this example: the Zariski topology for a commutative ring $A$ is given as follows: the topological space is the set $X$ of all prime ideals of $A.$ The base of the topology is given by the open sets $O_a$ of prime ideals that do not contain $a \in A.$ It is straightforward to verify that this indeed forms the basis: so $O_a \cap O_b = O_{ab}$ and $O_0 = \varnothing$ and $O_1 = X.$ The closed sets of the Zariski topology are the sets of prime ideals that do contain $a.$ Notice how this example differs subtly from the cofinite topology example, above: the points in the topology are not closed, in general, whereas in a T_{1} space, points are always closed.
- Every totally disconnected space is T_{1}, since every point is a connected component and therefore closed.

== Generalisations to other kinds of spaces ==
The terms "T_{1}", "R_{0}", and their synonyms can also be applied to such variations of topological spaces as uniform spaces, Cauchy spaces, and convergence spaces. The characteristic that unites the concept in all of these examples is that limits of fixed ultrafilters (or constant nets) are unique (for T_{1} spaces) or unique up to topological indistinguishability (for R_{0} spaces).

As it turns out, uniform spaces, and more generally Cauchy spaces, are always R_{0}, so the T_{1} condition in these cases reduces to the T_{0} condition. But R_{0} alone can be an interesting condition on other sorts of convergence spaces, such as pretopological spaces.

== See also ==
- Topological property – Mathematical property of a space

== Bibliography ==
- A.V. Arkhangel'skii, L.S. Pontryagin (Eds.) General Topology I (1990) Springer-Verlag ISBN 3-540-18178-4.
- Folland, Gerald (1999). Real analysis: modern techniques and their applications (2nd ed.). John Wiley & Sons, Inc. p. 116. ISBN 0-471-31716-0.
- Schechter, Eric (1996). Handbook of Analysis and Its Foundations. San Diego, CA: Academic Press. ISBN 978-0-12-622760-4. OCLC 175294365.
- Lynn Arthur Steen and J. Arthur Seebach, Jr., Counterexamples in Topology. Springer-Verlag, New York, 1978. Reprinted by Dover Publications, New York, 1995. ISBN 0-486-68735-X (Dover edition).
- Willard, Stephen (1998). General Topology. New York: Dover. pp. 86–90. ISBN 0-486-43479-6.
