= Regular space =

Property of topological space

Separation axioms in topological spaces

Kolmogorov classification
- T_{0}: (Kolmogorov)
- T_{1}: (Fréchet)
- T_{2}: (Hausdorff)
- T_{2½}: (Urysohn)
- completely T_{2}: (completely Hausdorff)
- T_{3}: (regular Hausdorff)
- T_{3½}: (Tychonoff)
- T_{4}: (normal Hausdorff)
- T_{5}: (completely normal Hausdorff)
- T_{6}: (perfectly normal Hausdorff)

In topology and related fields of mathematics, a topological space X is called a regular space if every closed subset C of X and a point p not contained in C have non-overlapping open neighborhoods. Thus p and C can be separated by neighborhoods. This condition is known as Axiom T_{3}. The term "T_{3} space" usually means "a regular Hausdorff space". These conditions are examples of separation axioms.

== Definitions ==
The point x, represented by a dot on the left of the picture, and the closed set F, represented by a closed disk on the right of the picture, are separated by their neighbourhoods U and V, represented by larger open disks. The dot x has plenty of room to wiggle around the open disk U, and the closed disk F has plenty of room to wiggle around the open disk V, yet U and V do not touch each other.

A topological space X is a regular space if, given any closed set F and any point x that does not belong to F, there exists a neighbourhood U of x and a neighbourhood V of F that are disjoint. Concisely put, it must be possible to separate x and F with disjoint neighborhoods.

A T_{3} space or regular Hausdorff space is a topological space that is both regular and a Hausdorff space. (A Hausdorff space or T_{2} space is a topological space in which any two distinct points are separated by neighbourhoods.) It turns out that a space is T_{3} if and only if it is both regular and T_{0}. (A T_{0} or Kolmogorov space is a topological space in which any two distinct points are topologically distinguishable, i.e., for every pair of distinct points, at least one of them has an open neighborhood not containing the other.) Indeed, if a space is Hausdorff then it is T_{0}, and each T_{0} regular space is Hausdorff: given two distinct points, at least one of them misses the closure of the other one, so (by regularity) there exist disjoint neighborhoods separating one point from (the closure of) the other.

Although the definitions presented here for "regular" and "T_{3}" are not uncommon, there is significant variation in the literature: some authors switch the definitions of "regular" and "T_{3}" as they are used here, or use both terms interchangeably. This article uses the term "regular" freely, but will usually say "regular Hausdorff", which is unambiguous, instead of the less precise "T_{3}". For more on this issue, see History of the separation axioms.

A locally regular space is a topological space where every point has an open neighbourhood that is regular. Every regular space is locally regular, but the converse is not true. A classical example of a locally regular space that is not regular is the bug-eyed line.

== Relationships to other separation axioms ==
A regular space is necessarily also preregular, i.e., any two topologically distinguishable points can be separated by neighbourhoods. Since a Hausdorff space is the same as a preregular T_{0} space, a regular space which is also T_{0} must be Hausdorff (and thus T_{3}). In fact, a regular Hausdorff space satisfies the slightly stronger condition T_{2½}. (However, such a space need not be completely Hausdorff.) Thus, the definition of T_{3} may cite T_{0}, T_{1}, or T_{2½} instead of T_{2} (Hausdorffness); all are equivalent in the context of regular spaces.

Speaking more theoretically, the conditions of regularity and T_{3}-ness are related by Kolmogorov quotients. A space is regular if and only if its Kolmogorov quotient is T_{3}; and, as mentioned, a space is T_{3} if and only if it's both regular and T_{0}. Thus a regular space encountered in practice can usually be assumed to be T_{3}, by replacing the space with its Kolmogorov quotient.

There are many results for topological spaces that hold for both regular and Hausdorff spaces. Most of the time, these results hold for all preregular spaces; they were listed for regular and Hausdorff spaces separately because the idea of preregular spaces came later. On the other hand, those results that are truly about regularity generally don't also apply to nonregular Hausdorff spaces.

There are many situations where another condition of topological spaces (such as normality, pseudonormality, paracompactness, or local compactness) will imply regularity if some weaker separation axiom, such as preregularity, is satisfied. Such conditions often come in two versions: a regular version and a Hausdorff version. Although Hausdorff spaces aren't generally regular, a Hausdorff space that is also (say) locally compact will be regular, because any Hausdorff space is preregular. Thus from a certain point of view, regularity is not really the issue here, and we could impose a weaker condition instead to get the same result. However, definitions are usually still phrased in terms of regularity, since this condition is more well known than any weaker one.

Most topological spaces studied in mathematical analysis are regular; in fact, they are usually completely regular, which is a stronger condition. Regular spaces should also be contrasted with normal spaces.

== Examples and nonexamples ==
A zero-dimensional space with respect to the small inductive dimension has a base consisting of clopen sets. Every such space is regular.

As described above, any completely regular space is regular, and any T_{0} space that is not Hausdorff (and hence not preregular) cannot be regular. Most examples of regular and nonregular spaces studied in mathematics may be found in those two articles. On the other hand, spaces that are regular but not completely regular, or preregular but not regular, are usually constructed only to provide counterexamples to conjectures, showing the boundaries of possible theorems. Of course, one can easily find regular spaces that are not T_{0}, and thus not Hausdorff, such as an indiscrete space, but these examples provide more insight on the T_{0} axiom than on regularity. An example of a regular space that is not completely regular is the Tychonoff corkscrew.

Most interesting spaces in mathematics that are regular also satisfy some stronger condition. Thus, regular spaces are usually studied to find properties and theorems, such as the ones below, that are actually applied to completely regular spaces, typically in analysis.

There exist Hausdorff spaces that are not regular. An example is the K-topology on the set $\R$ of real numbers. More generally, if $C$ is a fixed nonclosed subset of $\R$ with empty interior with respect to the usual Euclidean topology, one can construct a finer topology on $\R$ by taking as a base the collection of all sets $U$ and $U\setminus C$ for $U$ open in the usual topology. That topology will be Hausdorff, but not regular.

== Elementary properties ==
Suppose that X is a regular space. Then, given any point x and neighbourhood G of x, there is a closed neighbourhood E of x that is a subset of G. In fancier terms, the closed neighbourhoods of x form a local base at x. In fact, this property characterises regular spaces; if the closed neighbourhoods of each point in a topological space form a local base at that point, then the space must be regular.

Taking the interiors of these closed neighbourhoods, we see that the regular open sets form a base for the open sets of the regular space X. This property is actually weaker than regularity; a topological space whose regular open sets form a base is semiregular.
