= Normal space =

Type of topological space

Separation axioms in topological spaces

Kolmogorov classification
- T_{0}: (Kolmogorov)
- T_{1}: (Fréchet)
- T_{2}: (Hausdorff)
- T_{2½}: (Urysohn)
- completely T_{2}: (completely Hausdorff)
- T_{3}: (regular Hausdorff)
- T_{3½}: (Tychonoff)
- T_{4}: (normal Hausdorff)
- T_{5}: (completely normal Hausdorff)
- T_{6}: (perfectly normal Hausdorff)

In topology and related branches of mathematics, a normal space is a topological space in which any two disjoint closed sets have disjoint open neighborhoods. Such spaces need not be Hausdorff in general. A normal Hausdorff space is called a T_{4} space. Strengthenings of these concepts are detailed in the article below and include completely normal spaces and perfectly normal spaces, and their Hausdorff variants: T_{5} spaces and T_{6} spaces. All these conditions are examples of separation axioms.

== Definitions ==
The closed sets E and F, here represented by closed disks on opposite sides of the picture, are separated by their respective neighbourhoods U and V, here represented by larger, but still disjoint, open disks.

A topological space X is a normal space if, given any disjoint closed sets E and F, there are neighbourhoods U of E and V of F that are also disjoint. Intuitively, this condition says that E and F can be separated by neighbourhoods.

The following are equivalent characterizations:

- For each closed set $F$ and neighborhood $U$ of it, there exists a neighborhood $V$ of $F$ such that $F \subseteq V \subseteq \overline{V} \subseteq U.$
- For $X = U_1 \cup U_2$ with $U_1,U_2$ open, there exist disjoint open sets $V_1, V_2$ such that $X = U_1 \cup V_1 = U_2\cup V_2.$

(The second bullet is expressed entirely in terms of open sets; i.e., normality of a space is purely a property of its lattice of open sets; cf. Ideal (order theory) § Prime and maximal spectra.)

A T_{4} space is a T_{1} space X that is normal; this is equivalent to X being normal and Hausdorff.

=== Related definitions ===
A completely normal space, or hereditarily normal space, is a topological space X such that every subspace of X is a normal space. It turns out that X is completely normal if and only if every two separated sets can be separated by neighbourhoods. Also, X is completely normal if and only if every open subset of X is normal with the subspace topology.

A T_{5} space, or completely T_{4} space, is a completely normal T_{1} space X, which implies that X is Hausdorff; equivalently, every subspace of X must be a T_{4} space.

A perfectly normal space is a topological space $X$ in which every two disjoint closed sets $E$ and $F$ can be precisely separated by a function, in the sense that there is a continuous function $f$ from $X$ to the interval $[0,1]$ such that $f^{-1}(\{0\})=E$ and $f^{-1}(\{1\})=F$. This is a stronger separation property than normality, as by Urysohn's lemma disjoint closed sets in a normal space can be separated by a function, in the sense of $E\subseteq f^{-1}(\{0\})$ and $F\subseteq f^{-1}(\{1\})$, but not precisely separated in general. It turns out that X is perfectly normal if and only if X is normal and every closed set is a G_{δ} set. Equivalently, X is perfectly normal if and only if every closed set is the zero set of a continuous function. The equivalence between these three characterizations is called Vedenissoff's theorem. Every perfectly normal space is completely normal, because perfect normality is a hereditary property.

A T_{6} space, or perfectly T_{4} space, is a perfectly normal Hausdorff space.

Note that the terms "normal space" and "T_{4}" and derived concepts occasionally have a different meaning. (Nonetheless, "T_{5}" always means the same as "completely T_{4}", whatever the meaning of T_{4} may be.) The definitions given here are the ones usually used today. For more on this issue, see History of the separation axioms.

Terms like "normal regular space" and "normal Hausdorff space" also turn up in the literature—they simply mean that the space both is normal and satisfies the other condition mentioned. In particular, a normal Hausdorff space is the same thing as a T_{4} space. Given the historical confusion of the meaning of the terms, verbal descriptions when applicable are helpful, that is, "normal Hausdorff" instead of "T_{4}", or "completely normal Hausdorff" instead of "T_{5}".

Fully normal spaces and fully T_{4} spaces are discussed elsewhere; they are related to paracompactness.

A locally normal space is a topological space where every point has an open neighbourhood that is normal. Every normal space is locally normal, but the converse is not true. A classical example of a completely regular locally normal space that is not normal is the Nemytskii plane.

== Examples of normal spaces ==
Most spaces encountered in mathematical analysis are normal Hausdorff spaces, or at least normal regular spaces:

- All metric spaces (and hence all metrizable spaces) are perfectly normal Hausdorff;
- All pseudometric spaces (and hence all pseudometrizable spaces) are perfectly normal regular, although not in general Hausdorff;
- All compact Hausdorff spaces are normal;
- In particular, the Stone–Čech compactification of a Tychonoff space is normal Hausdorff;
- Generalizing the above examples, all paracompact Hausdorff spaces are normal, and all paracompact regular spaces are normal;
- All paracompact topological manifolds are perfectly normal Hausdorff. However, there exist non-paracompact manifolds that are not even normal.
- All order topologies on totally ordered sets are hereditarily normal and Hausdorff.
- Every regular second-countable space is completely normal, and every regular Lindelöf space is normal.

Also, all fully normal spaces are normal (even if not regular). Sierpiński space is an example of a normal space that is not regular.

== Examples of non-normal spaces ==
An important example of a non-normal topology is given by the Zariski topology on an algebraic variety or on the spectrum of a ring, which is used in algebraic geometry.

A non-normal space of some relevance to analysis is the topological vector space of all functions from the real line R to itself, with the topology of pointwise convergence. More generally, a theorem of Arthur Harold Stone states that the product of uncountably many non-compact metric spaces is never normal.

== Properties ==
Every closed subset of a normal space is normal. The continuous and closed image of a normal space is normal.

The main significance of normal spaces lies in the fact that they admit "enough" continuous real-valued functions, as expressed by the following theorems valid for any normal space X.

Urysohn's lemma: If A and B are two disjoint closed subsets of X, then there exists a continuous function f from X to the real line R such that f(x) = 0 for all x in A and f(x) = 1 for all x in B. In fact, we can take the values of f to be entirely within the unit interval [0,1]. In fancier terms, disjoint closed sets are not only separated by neighbourhoods, but also separated by a function.

More generally, the Tietze extension theorem: If A is a closed subset of X and f is a continuous function from A to R, then there exists a continuous function F: X → R that extends f in the sense that F(x) = f(x) for all x in A.

The map $\emptyset\rightarrow X$ has the lifting property with respect to a map from a certain finite topological space with five points (two open and three closed) to the space with one open and two closed points.

If U is a locally finite open cover of a normal space X, then there is a partition of unity precisely subordinate to U. This shows the relationship of normal spaces to paracompactness.

In fact, any space that satisfies any one of these three conditions must be normal.

A product of normal spaces is not necessarily normal. This fact was first proved by Robert Sorgenfrey. An example of this phenomenon is the Sorgenfrey plane. In fact, since there exist spaces which are Dowker, a product of a normal space and [0, 1] need not to be normal. Also, a subset of a normal space need not be normal (i.e. not every normal Hausdorff space is a completely normal Hausdorff space), since every Tychonoff space is a subset of its Stone–Čech compactification (which is normal Hausdorff). A more explicit example is the Tychonoff plank. The only large class of product spaces of normal spaces known to be normal are the products of compact Hausdorff spaces, since both compactness (Tychonoff's theorem) and the T_{2} axiom are preserved under arbitrary products.

== Relationships to other separation axioms ==
If a normal space is R_{0}, then it is in fact completely regular. Thus, anything from "normal R_{0}" to "normal completely regular" is the same as what we usually call normal regular. Taking Kolmogorov quotients, we see that all normal T_{1} spaces are Tychonoff. These are what we usually call normal Hausdorff spaces.

A topological space is said to be pseudonormal if given two disjoint closed sets in it, one of which is countable, there are disjoint open sets containing them. Every normal space is pseudonormal, but not vice versa.

Counterexamples to some variations on these statements can be found in the lists above. Specifically, Sierpiński space is normal but not regular, while the space of functions from R to itself is Tychonoff but not normal.

== See also ==
- Collectionwise normal space – Property of topological spaces stronger than normality
- Monotonically normal space – Property of topological spaces stronger than normality
