= Sequence covering map =

In mathematics, specifically topology, a sequence covering map is any of a class of maps between topological spaces whose definitions all somehow relate sequences in the codomain with sequences in the domain. Examples include sequentially quotient maps, sequence coverings, 1-sequence coverings, and 2-sequence coverings. These classes of maps are closely related to sequential spaces. If the domain and/or codomain have certain additional topological properties (often, the spaces being Hausdorff and first-countable is more than enough) then these definitions become equivalent to other well-known classes of maps, such as open maps or quotient maps, for example. In these situations, characterizations of such properties in terms of convergent sequences might provide benefits similar to those provided by, say for instance, the characterization of continuity in terms of sequential continuity or the characterization of compactness in terms of sequential compactness (whenever such characterizations hold).

== Definitions ==
=== Preliminaries ===
A subset $S$ of $(X, \tau)$ is said to be sequentially open in $(X, \tau)$ if whenever a sequence in $X$ converges (in $(X, \tau)$) to some point that belongs to $S,$ then that sequence is necessarily eventually in $S$ (i.e. at most finitely many points in the sequence do not belong to $S$). The set $\operatorname{SeqOpen}(X, \tau)$ of all sequentially open subsets of $(X, \tau)$ forms a topology on $X$ that is finer than $X$'s given topology $\tau.$ By definition, $(X, \tau)$ is called a sequential space if $\tau = \operatorname{SeqOpen}(X, \tau).$ Given a sequence $x_{\bull}$ in $X$ and a point $x \in X,$ $x_{\bull} \to x$ in $(X, \tau)$ if and only if $x_{\bull} \to x$ in $(X, \operatorname{SeqOpen}(X, \tau)).$ Moreover, $\operatorname{SeqOpen}(X, \tau)$ is the finest topology on $X$ for which this characterization of sequence convergence in $(X, \tau)$ holds.

A map $f : (X, \tau) \to (Y, \sigma)$ is called sequentially continuous if $f : (X, \operatorname{SeqOpen}(X, \tau)) \to (Y, \operatorname{SeqOpen}(Y, \sigma))$ is continuous, which happens if and only if for every sequence $x_{\bull} = \left(x_i\right)_{i=1}^{\infty}$ in $X$ and every $x \in X,$ if $x_{\bull} \to x$ in $(X, \tau)$ then necessarily $f\left(x_{\bull}\right) \to f(x)$ in $(Y, \sigma).$ Every continuous map is sequentially continuous although in general, the converse may fail to hold. In fact, a space $(X, \tau)$ is a sequential space if and only if it has the following universal property for sequential spaces:

for every topological space $(Y, \sigma)$ and every map $f : X \to Y,$ the map $f : (X, \tau) \to (Y, \sigma)$ is continuous if and only if it is sequentially continuous.

The sequential closure in $(X, \tau)$ of a subset $S \subseteq X$ is the set $\operatorname{scl}_{(X, \tau)} S$ consisting of all $x \in X$ for which there exists a sequence in $S$ that converges to $x$ in $(X, \tau).$ A subset $S \subseteq X$ is called sequentially closed in $(X, \tau)$ if $S = \operatorname{scl}_{(X, \tau)} S,$ which happens if and only if whenever a sequence in $S$ converges in $(X, \tau)$ to some point $x \in X$ then necessarily $x \in S.$ The space $(X, \tau)$ is called a Fréchet–Urysohn space if $\operatorname{scl}_X S ~=~ \operatorname{cl}_X S$ for every subset $S \subseteq X,$ which happens if and only if every subspace of $(X, \tau)$ is a sequential space. Every first-countable space is a Fréchet–Urysohn space and thus also a sequential space. All pseudometrizable spaces, metrizable spaces, and second-countable spaces are first-countable.

=== Sequence coverings ===
A sequence $x_{\bull} = \left(x_i\right)_{i=1}^\infty$ in a set $X$ is by definition a function $x_{\bull} : \N \to X$ whose value at $i \in \N$ is denoted by $x_i$ (although the usual notation used with functions, such as parentheses $x_{\bull}(i)$ or composition $f \circ x_{\bull},$ might be used in certain situations to improve readability). Statements such as "the sequence $x_{\bull}$ is injective" or "the image (i.e. range) $\operatorname{Im} x_{\bull}$ of a sequence $x_{\bull}$ is infinite" as well as other terminology and notation that is defined for functions can thus be applied to sequences. A sequence $s_{\bull}$ is said to be a subsequence of another sequence $x_{\bull}$ if there exists a strictly increasing map $l_{\bull} : \N \to \N$ (possibly denoted by $l_{\bull} = \left(l_k\right)_{k=1}^{\infty}$ instead) such that $s_k = x_{l_k}$ for every $k \in \N,$ where this condition can be expressed in terms of function composition $\circ$ as: $s_{\bull} = x_{\bull} \circ l_{\bull}.$ As usual, if $x_{l_{\bull}} = \left(x_{l_k}\right)_{k=1}^{\infty}$ is declared to be (such as by definition) a subsequence of $x_{\bull}$ then it should immediately be assumed that $l_{\bull} : \N \to \N$ is strictly increasing. The notation $x_{\bull} \subseteq S$ and $\operatorname{Im} x_{\bull} \subseteq S$ mean that the sequence $x_{\bull}$ is valued in the set $S.$

The function $f : X \to Y$ is called a sequence covering if for every convergent sequence $y_{\bull}$ in $Y,$ there exists a sequence $x_{\bull} \subseteq X$ such that $y_{\bull} = f \circ x_{\bull}.$ It is called a 1-sequence covering if for every $y \in Y$ there exists some $x \in f^{-1}(y)$ such that every sequence $y_{\bull} \subseteq Y$ that converges to $y$ in $(Y, \sigma),$ there exists a sequence $x_{\bull} \subseteq X$ such that $y_{\bull} = f \circ x_{\bull}$ and $x_{\bull}$ converges to $x$ in $(X, \tau).$ It is a 2-sequence covering if $f : X \to Y$ is surjective and also for every $y \in Y$ and every $x \in f^{-1}(y),$ every sequence $y_{\bull} \subseteq Y$ and converges to $y$ in $(Y, \sigma),$ there exists a sequence $x_{\bull} \subseteq X$ such that $y_{\bull} = f \circ x_{\bull}$ and $x_{\bull}$ converges to $x$ in $(X, \tau).$ A map $f : X \to Y$ is a compact covering if for every compact $K \subseteq Y$ there exists some compact subset $C \subseteq X$ such that $f(C) = K.$

=== Sequentially quotient mappings ===
In analogy with the definition of sequential continuity, a map $f : (X, \tau) \to (Y, \sigma)$ is called a sequentially quotient map if

$$f : (X, \operatorname{SeqOpen}(X, \tau)) \to (Y, \operatorname{SeqOpen}(Y, \sigma))$$

is a quotient map, which happens if and only if for any subset $S \subseteq Y,$ $S$ is sequentially open $(Y, \sigma)$ if and only if this is true of $f^{-1}(S)$ in $(X, \tau).$ Sequentially quotient maps were introduced in Boone & Siwiec 1976 who defined them as above.

Every sequentially quotient map is necessarily surjective and sequentially continuous although they may fail to be continuous. If $f : (X, \tau) \to (Y, \sigma)$ is a sequentially continuous surjection whose domain $(X, \tau)$ is a sequential space, then $f : (X, \tau) \to (Y, \sigma)$ is a quotient map if and only if $(Y, \sigma)$ is a sequential space and $f : (X, \tau) \to (Y, \sigma)$ is a sequentially quotient map.

Call a space $(Y, \sigma)$ sequentially Hausdorff if $(Y, \operatorname{SeqOpen}(Y, \sigma))$ is a Hausdorff space. In an analogous manner, a "sequential version" of every other separation axiom can be defined in terms of whether or not the space $(Y, \operatorname{SeqOpen}(Y, \sigma))$ possess it. Every Hausdorff space is necessarily sequentially Hausdorff. A sequential space is Hausdorff if and only if it is sequentially Hausdorff.

If $f : (X, \tau) \to (Y, \sigma)$ is a sequentially continuous surjection then assuming that $(Y, \sigma)$ is sequentially Hausdorff, the following are equivalent:

1. $f : (X, \tau) \to (Y, \sigma)$ is sequentially quotient.
2. Whenever $y_{\bull} \to y$ is a convergent sequence in $Y$ then there exists a convergent sequence $x_{\bull} \to x$ in $X$ such that $f(x) = y$ and $f \circ x_{\bull}$ is a subsequence of $y_{\bull}.$
3. Whenever $y_{\bull}$ is a convergent sequence in $Y$ then there exists a convergent sequence $x_{\bull}$ in $X$ such that $f \circ x_{\bull}$ is a subsequence of $y_{\bull}.$
  - This statement differs from (2) above only in that there are no requirements placed on the limits of the sequences (which becomes an important difference only when $Y$ is not sequentially Hausdorff).
  - If $f : X \to Y$ is a continuous surjection onto a sequentially compact space $Y$ then this condition holds even if $Y$ is not sequentially Hausdorff.

If the assumption that $Y$ is sequentially Hausdorff were to be removed, then statement (2) would still imply the other two statement but the above characterization would no longer be guaranteed to hold (however, if points in the codomain were required to be sequentially closed then any sequentially quotient map would necessarily satisfy condition (3)). This remains true even if the sequential continuity requirement on $f : X \to Y$ was strengthened to require (ordinary) continuity. Instead of using the original definition, some authors define "sequentially quotient map" to mean a continuous surjection that satisfies condition (2) or alternatively, condition (3). If the codomain is sequentially Hausdorff then these definitions differs from the original only in the added requirement of continuity (rather than merely requiring sequential continuity).

The map $f : (X, \tau) \to (Y, \sigma)$ is called presequential if for every convergent sequence $y_{\bull} \to y$ in $(Y, \sigma)$ such that $y_{\bull}$ is not eventually equal to $y,$ the set $\bigcup_{\stackrel{i \in \N,}{y_i \neq y}} f^{-1}\left(y_i\right)$ is not sequentially closed in $(X, \tau),$ where this set may also be described as:

$$\bigcup_{\stackrel{i \in \N,}{y_i \neq y}} f^{-1}\left(y_i\right)
~=~ f^{-1} \left(\left(\operatorname{Im} y_{\bull}\right) \setminus \{ y \}\right)
~=~ f^{-1} \left(\operatorname{Im} y_{\bull}\right) \setminus f^{-1}(y)$$

Equivalently, $f : (X, \tau) \to (Y, \sigma)$ is presequential if and only if for every convergent sequence $y_{\bull} \to y$ in $(Y, \sigma)$ such that $y_{\bull} \subseteq Y \setminus \{ y \},$ the set $f^{-1} \left(\operatorname{Im} y_{\bull}\right)$ is not sequentially closed in $(X, \tau).$

A surjective map $f : (X, \tau) \to (Y, \sigma)$ between Hausdorff spaces is sequentially quotient if and only if it is sequentially continuous and a presequential map.

== Characterizations ==
If $f : (X, \tau) \to (Y, \sigma)$ is a continuous surjection between two first-countable Hausdorff spaces then the following statements are true:

- $f$ is almost open if and only if it is a 1-sequence covering.
  - An almost open map is surjective map $f : X \to Y$ with the property that for every $y \in Y,$ there exists some $x \in f^{-1}(y)$ such that $x$ is a point of openness for $f,$ which by definition means that for every open neighborhood $U$ of $x,$ $f(U)$ is a neighborhood of $f(x)$ in $Y.$
- $f$ is an open map if and only if it is a 2-sequence covering.
- If $f$ is a compact covering map then $f$ is a quotient map.
- The following are equivalent:
  1. $f$ is a quotient map.
  2. $f$ is a sequentially quotient map.
  3. $f$ is a sequence covering.
  4. $f$ is a pseudo-open map.
    - A map $f : X \to Y$ is called pseudo-open if for every $y \in Y$ and every open neighborhood $U$ of $f^{-1}(y)$ (meaning an open subset $U$ such that $f^{-1}(y) \subseteq U$), $y$ necessarily belongs to the interior (taken in $Y$) of $f(U).$
  and if in addition both $X$ and $Y$ are separable metric spaces then to this list may be appended:
  5. $f$ is a hereditarily quotient map.

== Properties ==
The following is a sufficient condition for a continuous surjection to be sequentially open, which with additional assumptions, results in a characterization of open maps. Assume that $f : X \to Y$ is a continuous surjection from a regular space $X$ onto a Hausdorff space $Y.$ If the restriction $f\big\vert_U : U \to f(U)$ is sequentially quotient for every open subset $U$ of $X$ then $f : X \to Y$ maps open subsets of $X$ to sequentially open subsets of $Y.$ Consequently, if $X$ and $Y$ are also sequential spaces, then $f : X \to Y$ is an open map if and only if $f\big\vert_U : U \to f(U)$ is sequentially quotient (or equivalently, quotient) for every open subset $U$ of $X.$

Given an element $y \in Y$ in the codomain of a (not necessarily surjective) continuous function $f : X \to Y,$ the following gives a sufficient condition for $y$ to belong to $f$'s image: $y \in \operatorname{Im} f := f(X).$ A family $\mathcal{B}$ of subsets of a topological space $(X, \tau)$ is said to be locally finite at a point $x \in X$ if there exists some open neighborhood $U$ of $x$ such that the set $\left\{ B \in \mathcal{B} ~:~ U \cap B \neq \varnothing \right\}$ is finite. Assume that $f : X \to Y$ is a continuous map between two Hausdorff first-countable spaces and let $y \in Y.$ If there exists a sequence $y_{\bull} = \left(y_i\right)_{i=1}^{\infty}$ in $Y$ such that (1) $y_{\bull} \to y$ and (2) there exists some $x \in X$ such that $\left\{ f^{-1}\left(y_i\right) ~:~ i \in \N \right\}$ is not locally finite at $x,$ then $y \in \operatorname{Im} f = f(X).$ The converse is true if there is no point at which $f$ is locally constant; that is, if there does not exist any non-empty open subset of $X$ on which $f$ restricts to a constant map.

== Sufficient conditions ==
Suppose $f : X \to Y$ is a continuous open surjection from a first-countable space $X$ onto a Hausdorff space $Y,$ let $D \subseteq Y$ be any non-empty subset, and let $y \in \operatorname{cl}_Y D$ where $\operatorname{cl}_Y D$ denotes the closure of $D$ in $Y.$ Then given any $x, z \in f^{-1}(y)$ and any sequence $x_{\bull}$ in $f^{-1}(D)$ that converges to $x,$ there exists a sequence $z_{\bull}$ in $f^{-1}(D)$ that converges to $z$ as well as a subsequence $\left(x_{l_k}\right)_{k=1}^\infty$ of $x_{\bull}$ such that $f(z_k) = f\left(x_{l_k}\right)$ for all $k \in \N.$ In short, this states that given a convergent sequence $x_{\bull} \subseteq f^{-1}(D)$ such that $x_{\bull} \to x$ then for any other $z \in f^{-1}(f(x))$ belonging to the same fiber as $x,$ it is always possible to find a subsequence $x_{l_{\bull}} = \left(x_{l_k}\right)_{k=1}^\infty$ such that $f \circ x_{l_{\bull}} = \left(f\left(x_{l_k}\right)\right)_{k=1}^\infty$ can be "lifted" by $f$ to a sequence that converges to $z.$

The following shows that under certain conditions, a map's fiber being a countable set is enough to guarantee the existence of a point of openness. If $f : X \to Y$ is a sequence covering from a Hausdorff sequential space $X$ onto a Hausdorff first-countable space $Y$ and if $y \in Y$ is such that the fiber $f^{-1}(y)$ is a countable set, then there exists some $x \in f^{-1}(y)$ such that $x$ is a point of openness for $f : X \to Y.$ Consequently, if $f : X \to Y$ is quotient map between two Hausdorff first-countable spaces and if every fiber of $f$ is countable, then $f : X \to Y$ is an almost open map and consequently, also a 1-sequence covering.

== See also ==
- Fréchet–Urysohn space – Type of topological space
- Open map – Functions that send open (resp. closed) subsets to open (resp. closed) subsets
- Perfect map – Continuous closed surjective map, each of whose fibers are also compact sets
- Proper map – Mathematical map between topological spaces
- Sequential space – Topological space characterized by sequences
- Sequentially compact space – Topological space where every sequence has a convergent subsequence
