= Fréchet–Urysohn space =

Type of topological space

In the field of topology, a Fréchet–Urysohn space is a topological space $X$ with the property that for every subset $S \subseteq X$ the closure of $S$ in $X$ is identical to the sequential closure of $S$ in $X.$ Fréchet–Urysohn spaces are a special type of sequential space.

The property is named after Maurice Fréchet and Pavel Urysohn.

== Definitions ==
Let $(X, \tau)$ be a topological space. The sequential closure of $S$ in $(X, \tau)$ is the set:
$$\begin{alignat}{4}
\operatorname{scl} S
:&= [ S]_{\operatorname{seq}}
:= \left\{ x \in X ~:~ \text{ there exists a sequence } s_{\bull} = \left(s_i\right)_{i=1}^{\infty} \subseteq S \text{ in } S \text{ such that } s_{\bull} \to x \text{ in } (X, \tau) \right\}
\end{alignat}$$

where $\operatorname{scl}_X S$ or $\operatorname{scl}_{(X, \tau)} S$ may be written if clarity is needed.

A topological space $(X, \tau)$ is said to be a Fréchet–Urysohn space if
$$\operatorname{cl}_X S = \operatorname{scl}_X S$$

for every subset $S \subseteq X,$ where $\operatorname{cl}_X S$ denotes the closure of $S$ in $(X, \tau).$

=== Sequentially open/closed sets ===
Suppose that $S \subseteq X$ is any subset of $X.$ A sequence $x_1, x_2, \ldots$ is eventually in $S$ if there exists a positive integer $N$ such that $x_i \in S$ for all indices $i \geq N.$

The set $S$ is called sequentially open if every sequence $\left(x_i\right)_{i=1}^{\infty}$ in $X$ that converges to a point of $S$ is eventually in $S$; Typically, if $X$ is understood then $\operatorname{scl} S$ is written in place of $\operatorname{scl}_X S.$

The set $S$ is called sequentially closed if $S = \operatorname{scl}_X S,$ or equivalently, if whenever $x_{\bull} = \left(x_i\right)_{i=1}^{\infty}$ is a sequence in $S$ converging to $x,$ then $x$ must also be in $S.$ The complement of a sequentially open set is a sequentially closed set, and vice versa.

Let
$$\begin{alignat}{4}
\operatorname{SeqOpen} (X, \tau)
:&= \left\{ S \subseteq X ~:~ S \text{ is sequentially open in } (X, \tau) \right\} \\
&= \left\{ S \subseteq X ~:~ S = \operatorname{SeqInt}_{(X, \tau)} S \right\} \\
\end{alignat}$$

denote the set of all sequentially open subsets of $(X, \tau),$ where this may be denoted by $\operatorname{SeqOpen} X$ is the topology $\tau$ is understood. The set $\operatorname{SeqOpen} (X, \tau)$ is a topology on $X$ that is finer than the original topology $\tau.$ Every open (resp. closed) subset of $X$ is sequentially open (resp. sequentially closed), which implies that
$$\tau \subseteq \operatorname{SeqOpen} (X, \tau).$$

=== Strong Fréchet–Urysohn space ===
A topological space $X$ is a strong Fréchet–Urysohn space if for every point $x \in X$ and every sequence $A_1, A_2, \ldots$ of subsets of the space $X$ such that $x \in \bigcap_n \overline{A_n},$ there exist a sequence $\left( a_i \right)_{i=1}^{\infty}$ in $X$ such that $a_i \in A_i$ for every $i \in \mathbb{N}$ and $\left( a_i \right)_{i=1}^{\infty} \to x$ in $(X, \tau).$ The above properties can be expressed as selection principles.

=== Contrast to sequential spaces ===
Every open subset of $X$ is sequentially open and every closed set is sequentially closed. However, the converses are in general not true. The spaces for which the converses are true are called sequential spaces; that is, a sequential space is a topological space in which every sequentially open subset is necessarily open, or equivalently, it is a space in which every sequentially closed subset is necessarily closed. Every Fréchet-Urysohn space is a sequential space but there are sequential spaces that are not Fréchet-Urysohn spaces.

Sequential spaces (respectively, Fréchet-Urysohn spaces) can be viewed/interpreted as exactly those spaces $X$ where for any single given subset $S \subseteq X,$ knowledge of which sequences in $X$ converge to which point(s) of $X$ (and which do not) is sufficient to determine whether or not $S$ is closed in $X$ (respectively, is sufficient to determine the closure of $S$ in $X$). (Note: Of course, if you can determine all of the supersets of $S$ that are closed in $X$ then you can determine the closure of $S.$ So this interpretation assumes that you can only determine whether or not $S$ is closed (and that this is not possible with any other subset); said differently, you cannot apply this "test" (of whether a subset is open/closed) to infinitely many subsets simultaneously (e.g. you can not use something akin to the axiom of choice). It is in Fréchet-Urysohn spaces that the closure of a set $S$ can be determined without it ever being necessary to consider a subset of $X$ other than $S;$ this is not always possible in non-Fréchet-Urysohn spaces.) Thus sequential spaces are those spaces $X$ for which sequences in $X$ can be used as a "test" to determine whether or not any given subset is open (or equivalently, closed) in $X$; or said differently, sequential spaces are those spaces whose topologies can be completely characterized in terms of sequence convergence. In any space that is not sequential, there exists a subset for which this "test" gives a "false positive." (Note: Although this "test" (which attempts to answer "is this set open (resp. closed)?") could potentially give a "false positive," it can never give a "false negative;" this is because every open (resp. closed) subset $S$ is necessarily sequentially open (resp. sequentially closed) so this "test" will never indicate "false" for any set $S$ that really is open (resp. closed).)

== Characterizations ==
If $(X, \tau)$ is a topological space then the following are equivalent:

1. $X$ is a Fréchet–Urysohn space.
2. Definition: $\operatorname{scl}_X S ~=~ \operatorname{cl}_X S$ for every subset $S \subseteq X.$
3. $\operatorname{scl}_X S ~\supseteq~ \operatorname{cl}_X S$ for every subset $S \subseteq X.$
  - This statement is equivalent to the definition above because $\operatorname{scl}_X S ~\subseteq~ \operatorname{cl}_X S$ always holds for every $S \subseteq X.$
4. Every subspace of $X$ is a sequential space.
5. For any subset $S \subseteq X$ that is not closed in $X$ and for every $x \in \left( \operatorname{cl}_X S \right) \setminus S,$ there exists a sequence in $S$ that converges to $x.$
  - Contrast this condition to the following characterization of a sequential space:
  For any subset $S \subseteq X$ that is not closed in $X,$ there exists some $x \in \left( \operatorname{cl}_X S \right) \setminus S$ for which there exists a sequence in $S$ that converges to $x.$
  - This characterization implies that every Fréchet–Urysohn space is a sequential space.

The characterization below shows that from among Hausdorff sequential spaces, Fréchet–Urysohn spaces are exactly those for which a "cofinal convergent diagonal sequence" can always be found, similar to the diagonal principal that is used to characterize topologies in terms of convergent nets. In the following characterization, all convergence is assumed to take place in $(X, \tau).$

If $(X, \tau)$ is a Hausdorff sequential space then $X$ is a Fréchet–Urysohn space if and only if the following condition holds: If $\left(x_l\right)_{l=1}^{\infty}$ is a sequence in $X$ that converge to some $x \in X$ and if for every $l \in \N,$ $\left(x_l^i\right)_{i=1}^{\infty}$ is a sequence in $X$ that converges to $x_l,$ where these hypotheses can be summarized by the following diagram

$$\begin{alignat}{11}
&x_1^1 ~\;~ &x_1^2 ~\;~ &x_1^3 ~\;~   &x_1^4 ~\;~ &x_1^5 ~~ &\ldots ~~ &x_1^i ~~   \ldots ~~ &\to ~~       &x_1 \\[1.2ex]
&x_2^1 ~\;~ &x_2^2 ~\;~ &x_2^3 ~\;~   &x_2^4 ~\;~ &x_2^5 ~~ &\ldots ~~ &x_2^i ~~   \ldots ~~ &\to ~~       &x_2 \\[1.2ex]
&x_3^1 ~\;~ &x_3^2 ~\;~ &x_3^3 ~\;~   &x_3^4 ~\;~ &x_3^5 ~~ &\ldots ~~ &x_3^i ~~   \ldots ~~ &\to ~~       &x_3 \\[1.2ex]
&x_4^1 ~\;~ &x_4^2 ~\;~ &x_4^3 ~\;~   &x_4^4 ~\;~ &x_4^5 ~~ &\ldots ~~ &x_4^i ~~   \ldots ~~ &\to ~~       &x_4 \\[0.5ex]
&           &           &\;\,\vdots   &           &         &          &\;\,\vdots           &             &\;\,\vdots \\[0.5ex]
&x_l^1 ~\;~ &x_l^2 ~\;~ &x_l^3 ~\;~   &x_l^4 ~\;~ &x_l^5 ~~ &\ldots ~~ &x_l^i ~~   \ldots ~~ &\to ~~       &x_l \\[0.5ex]
&           &           &\;\,\vdots   &           &         &          &\;\,\vdots           &             &\;\,\vdots \\
&           &           &             &           &         &          &                     &             &\,\downarrow \\
&           &           &             &           &         &          &                     &    ~~       &\;x \\
\end{alignat}$$
then there exist strictly increasing maps $\iota, \lambda : \N \to \N$ such that $\left(x_{\lambda(n)}^{\iota(n)}\right)_{n=1}^{\infty} \to x.$

(It suffices to consider only sequences $\left(x_l\right)_{l=1}^{\infty}$ with infinite ranges (i.e. $\left\{x_l : l \in \N\right\}$ is infinite) because if it is finite then Hausdorffness implies that it is necessarily eventually constant with value $x,$ in which case the existence of the maps $\iota, \lambda : \N \to \N$ with the desired properties is readily verified for this special case (even if $(X, \tau)$ is not a Fréchet–Urysohn space).

== Properties ==
Every subspace of a Fréchet–Urysohn space is Fréchet–Urysohn.

Every Fréchet–Urysohn space is a sequential space although the opposite implication is not true in general.

If a Hausdorff locally convex topological vector space $(X, \tau)$ is a Fréchet-Urysohn space then $\tau$ is equal to the final topology on $X$ induced by the set $\operatorname{Arc}\left([0, 1]; X\right)$ of all arcs in $(X, \tau),$ which by definition are continuous paths $[0, 1] \to (X, \tau)$ that are also topological embeddings.

== Examples ==
Every first-countable space is a Fréchet–Urysohn space. Consequently, every second-countable space, every metrizable space, and every pseudometrizable space is a Fréchet–Urysohn space. It also follows that every topological space $(X, \tau)$ on a finite set $X$ is a Fréchet–Urysohn space.

=== Metrizable continuous dual spaces ===
A metrizable locally convex topological vector space (TVS) $X$ (for example, a Fréchet space) is a normable space if and only if its strong dual space $X^{\prime}_b$ is a Fréchet–Urysohn space, or equivalently, if and only if $X^{\prime}_b$ is a normable space.

=== Sequential spaces that are not Fréchet–Urysohn ===
Direct limit of finite-dimensional Euclidean spaces

The space of finite real sequences $\R^{\infty}$ is a Hausdorff sequential space that is not Fréchet–Urysohn. For every integer $n \geq 1,$ identify $\R^n$ with the set $\R^n \times \{ \left( 0, 0, 0, \ldots \right)\} = \left\{ \left( x_1, \ldots, x_n, 0, 0, 0, \ldots \right) ~:~x_1, \ldots, x_n \in \R \right\},$ where the latter is a subset of the space of sequences of real numbers $\R^{\mathbb{N}};$ explicitly, the elements $\left( x_1, \ldots, x_n \right) \in \R^n$ and $\left( x_1, \ldots, x_n, 0, 0, 0, \ldots \right)$ are identified together. In particular, $\R^n$ can be identified as a subset of $\R^{n+1}$ and more generally, as a subset $\R^n \subseteq \R^{n+k}$ for any integer $k \geq 0.$ Let
$$\begin{alignat}{4}
\R^{\infty}
:= \left\{ \left( x_1, x_2, \ldots \right) \in \R^{\mathbb{N}} ~:~ \text{ all but finitely many } x_i \text{ are equal to } 0 \right\}
= \bigcup_{n=1}^{\infty} \R^n.
\end{alignat}$$
Give $\R^{\infty}$ its usual topology $\tau,$ in which a subset $S \subseteq \R^{\infty}$ is open (resp. closed) if and only if for every integer $n \geq 1,$ the set $S \cap \R^n = \left\{ \left( x_1, \ldots, x_n \right) ~:~ \left( x_1, \ldots, x_n, 0, 0, \ldots \right) \in S \right\}$ is an open (resp. closed) subset of $\R^n$ (with it usual Euclidean topology). If $v \in \R^{\infty}$ and $v_{\bull}$ is a sequence in $\R^{\infty}$ then $v_{\bull} \to v$ in $\left( \R^{\infty}, \tau \right)$ if and only if there exists some integer $n \geq 1$ such that both $v$ and $v_{\bull}$ are contained in $\R^n$ and $v_{\bull} \to v$ in $\R^n.$ From these facts, it follows that $\left(\R^{\infty}, \tau\right)$ is a sequential space. For every integer $n \geq 1,$ let $B_n$ denote the open ball in $\R^n$ of radius $1/n$ (in the Euclidean norm) centered at the origin. Let $S := \R^{\infty} \,\setminus\, \bigcup_{n=1}^{\infty} B_n.$ Then the closure of $S$ is $\left(\R^{\infty}, \tau\right)$ is all of $\R^{\infty}$ but the origin $(0, 0, 0, \ldots)$ of $\R^{\infty}$ does not belong to the sequential closure of $S$ in $\left(\R^{\infty}, \tau\right).$ In fact, it can be shown that
$$\R^{\infty} = \operatorname{cl}_{\R^{\infty}} S ~\neq~ \operatorname{scl}_{\R^{\infty}} S = \R^{\infty} \setminus \{(0, 0, 0, \ldots)\}.$$
This proves that $\left(\R^{\infty}, \tau\right)$ is not a Fréchet–Urysohn space.

Montel DF-spaces

Every infinite-dimensional Montel DF-space is a sequential space but not a Fréchet–Urysohn space.

The Schwartz space $\mathcal{S}\left(\R^n\right)$ and the space of smooth functions $C^{\infty}(U)$

The following extensively used spaces are prominent examples of sequential spaces that are not Fréchet–Urysohn spaces. Let $\mathcal{S}\left(\R^n\right)$ denote the Schwartz space and let $C^{\infty}(U)$ denote the space of smooth functions on an open subset $U \subseteq \R^n,$ where both of these spaces have their usual Fréchet space topologies, as defined in the article about distributions. Both $\mathcal{S}\left(\R^n\right)$ and $C^{\infty}(U),$ as well as the strong dual spaces of both these of spaces, are complete nuclear Montel ultrabornological spaces, which implies that all four of these locally convex spaces are also paracompact normal reflexive barrelled spaces. The strong dual spaces of both $\mathcal{S}\left(\R^n\right)$ and $C^{\infty}(U)$ are sequential spaces but neither one of these duals is a Fréchet-Urysohn space.

== See also ==
- Axiom of countability
- First-countable space – Topological space where each point has a countable neighbourhood basis
- Limit of a sequence – Value to which an infinite sequence tends
- Sequence covering map
- Sequential space – Topological space characterized by sequences
