= Local diffeomorphism =

Smooth map which is a diffeomorphism upon restriction

In mathematics, more specifically differential topology, a local diffeomorphism is intuitively a map between smooth manifolds that preserves the local differentiable structure. The formal definition of a local diffeomorphism is given below.

== Formal definition ==
Let $X$ and $Y$ be differentiable manifolds. A function $f:X \to Y$ is a local diffeomorphism if, for each point $x \in X$, there exists an open set $U$ containing $x$ such that the image $f(U)$ is open in $Y$ and
$$f\vert_U : U \to f(U)$$
is a diffeomorphism.

A local diffeomorphism is a special case of an immersion $f : X \to Y$. In this case, for each $x \in X$, there exists an open set $U$ containing $x$ such that the image $f(U)$ is an embedded submanifold, and $f|_U:U \to f(U)$ is a diffeomorphism. Here $X$ and $f(U)$ have the same dimension, which may be less than the dimension of $Y$.

=== Characterizations ===
A map is a local diffeomorphism if and only if it is a smooth immersion (smooth local embedding) and an open map.

The inverse function theorem implies that a smooth map $f:X \to Y$ is a local diffeomorphism if and only if the derivative $D f_x : T_x X \to T_{f(x)} Y$ is a linear isomorphism for all points $x \in X$. This implies that $X$ and $Y$ have the same dimension.

It follows that a map $f : X \to Y$ between two manifolds of equal dimension ($\operatorname{dim} X = \operatorname{dim} Y$) is a local diffeomorphism if and only if it is a smooth immersion (smooth local embedding), or equivalently, if and only if it is a smooth submersion. This is because, for any $x \in X$, both $T_xX$ and $T_{f(x)}Y$ have the same dimension, thus $Df_x$ is a linear isomorphism if and only if it is injective, or equivalently, if and only if it is surjective.

Here is an alternative argument for the case of an immersion: every smooth immersion is a locally injective function, while invariance of domain guarantees that any continuous injective function between manifolds of equal dimensions is necessarily an open map.

== Discussion ==
All manifolds of the same dimension are "locally diffeomorphic," in the following sense: if $X$ and $Y$ have the same dimension, and $x \in X$ and $y\in Y$, then there exist open neighbourhoods $U$ of $x$ and $V$ of $y$ and a diffeomorphism $f:U \to V$. However, this map $f$ need not extend to a smooth map defined on all of $X$, let alone extend to a local diffeomorphism. Thus the existence of a local diffeomorphism $f:X \to Y$ is a stronger condition than "to be locally diffeomorphic." Indeed, although locally defined diffeomorphisms preserve differentiable structure locally, one must be able to "patch up" these (local) diffeomorphisms to ensure that the domain is the entire smooth manifold.

For example, one can impose two different differentiable structures on $\R^4$ that each make $\R^4$ into a differentiable manifold, but both structures are not locally diffeomorphic (see Exotic $\mathbb{R}^4$).

As another example, there can be no local diffeomorphism from the 2-sphere to Euclidean 2-space, although they do indeed have the same local differentiable structure. This is because all local diffeomorphisms are continuous, the continuous image of a compact space is compact, and the 2-sphere is compact whereas Euclidean 2-space is not.

=== Properties ===
If a local diffeomorphism between two manifolds exists then their dimensions must be equal. Every local diffeomorphism is also a local homeomorphism and therefore a locally injective open map. A local diffeomorphism has constant rank of $n.$

== Examples ==
- A diffeomorphism is a bijective local diffeomorphism.
- A smooth covering map is a local diffeomorphism such that every point in the target has a neighborhood that is evenly covered by the map.

== See also ==
- Diffeomorphism – Isomorphism of differentiable manifolds
- Homeomorphism – Mapping which preserves all topological properties of a given space
- Invariance of domain – Theorem in topology about homeomorphic subsets of Euclidean space
- Large diffeomorphism – Class of diffeomorphism
- Local homeomorphism – Mathematical function revertible near each point
- Spacetime symmetries – Type of symmetry in physics
