= Local homeomorphism =

Mathematical function revertible near each point

In mathematics, more specifically topology, a local homeomorphism is a function between topological spaces that, intuitively, preserves local (though not necessarily global) structure. If $f : X \to Y$ is a local homeomorphism, $X$ is said to be an étale space over $Y.$ Local homeomorphisms are used in the study of sheaves. Typical examples of local homeomorphisms are covering maps.

A topological space $X$ is locally homeomorphic to $Y$ if every point of $X$ has a neighborhood that is homeomorphic to an open subset of $Y.$ For example, a manifold of dimension $n$ is locally homeomorphic to $\R^n.$

If there is a local homeomorphism from $X$ to $Y,$ then $X$ is locally homeomorphic to $Y,$ but the converse is not always true. For example, the two dimensional sphere, being a manifold, is locally homeomorphic to the plane $\R^2,$ but there is no local homeomorphism $S^2 \to \R^2.$

== Formal definition ==
A function $f : X \to Y$ between two topological spaces is called a local homeomorphism if every point $x \in X$ has an open neighborhood $U$ whose image $f(U)$ is open in $Y$ and the restriction $f\big\vert_U : U \to f(U)$ is a homeomorphism (where the respective subspace topologies are used on $U$ and on $f(U)$).

== Examples and sufficient conditions ==
Covering maps

Every homeomorphism is a local homeomorphism. The function $\R \to S^1$ defined by $t \mapsto e^{it}$ (so that geometrically, this map wraps the real line around the circle in the complex plane) is a local homeomorphism but not a homeomorphism. The map $f : S^1 \to S^1$ defined by $f(z) = z^n,$ where $n$ is a fixed integer, wraps the circle around itself $n$ times (that is, has winding number $n$) and is a local homeomorphism for all non-zero $n,$ but it is a homeomorphism only when it is bijective (that is, only when $n = 1$ or $n = -1$).

Generalizing the previous two examples, every covering map is a local homeomorphism; in particular, the universal cover $p : C \to Y$ of a space $Y$ is a local homeomorphism. In certain situations the converse is true. For example: if $p : X \to Y$ is a proper local homeomorphism between two Hausdorff spaces and if $Y$ is also locally compact, then $p$ is a covering map.

Inclusion maps of open subsets

If $U \subseteq X$ is any subspace (where as usual, $U$ is equipped with the subspace topology induced by $X$) then the inclusion map $i : U \to X$ is always a topological embedding. It is a local homeomorphism if and only if $U$ is open in $X.$

Invariance of domain

Invariance of domain guarantees that if $f : U \to \R^n$ is a continuous injective map from an open subset $U$ of $\R^n,$ then $f(U)$ is open in $\R^n$ and $f : U \to f(U)$ is a homeomorphism. Consequently, a continuous map $f : U \to \R^n$ from an open subset $U \subseteq \R^n$ will be a local homeomorphism if and only if it is a locally injective map (meaning that every point in $U$ has a neighborhood $N$ such that the restriction of $f$ to $N$ is injective).

Local homeomorphisms in analysis

It is shown in complex analysis that a complex analytic function $f : U \to \Complex$ (where $U$ is an open subset of the complex plane $\Complex$) is a local homeomorphism precisely when the derivative $f^{\prime}(z)$ is non-zero for all $z \in U.$ The function $f(z) = z^n$, with fixed integer $n$, defined on an open disk around $0$, is not a local homeomorphism when $n \geq 2.$ In that case $0$ is a point of "ramification" (intuitively, $n$ sheets come together there).

Using the inverse function theorem one can show that a continuously differentiable function $f : U \to \R^n$ (where $U$ is an open subset of $\R^n$) is a local homeomorphism if the derivative $D_x f$ is an invertible linear map (invertible square matrix) for every $x \in U.$ (The converse is false, as shown by the local homeomorphism $f : \R \to \R$ with $f(x) = x^3$). An analogous condition can be formulated for maps between differentiable manifolds.

Local homeomorphisms and Hausdorffness

There exist local homeomorphisms $f : X \to Y$ where $Y$ is a Hausdorff space but $X$ is not. Consider for instance the quotient space $X = \left(\R \sqcup \R\right) / {\sim},$ where the equivalence relation $\sim$ on the disjoint union of two copies of the reals identifies every negative real of the first copy with the corresponding negative real of the second copy. The two copies of $0$ are not identified and they do not have any disjoint neighborhoods, so $X$ is not Hausdorff. One readily checks that the natural map $f : X \to \R$ is a local homeomorphism. The fiber $f^{-1}(\{y\})$ has two elements if $y \geq 0$ and one element if $y < 0.$

Similarly, it is possible to construct a local homeomorphisms $f : X \to Y$ where $X$ is Hausdorff and $Y$ is not: pick the natural map from $X = \R \sqcup \R$ to $Y = \left(\R \sqcup \R\right) / {\sim}$ with the same equivalence relation $\sim$ as above.

Local homeomorphisms and fibers

Suppose $f : X \to Y$ is a continuous open surjection between two Hausdorff second-countable spaces where $X$ is a Baire space and $Y$ is a normal space. If every fiber of $f$ is a discrete subspace of $X$ (which is a necessary condition for $f : X \to Y$ to be a local homeomorphism) then $f$ is a $Y$-valued local homeomorphism on a dense open subset of $X.$ To clarify this statement's conclusion, let $O = O_f$ be the (unique) largest open subset of $X$ such that $f\big\vert_O : O \to Y$ is a local homeomorphism. (Note: The assumptions that $f$ is continuous and open imply that the set $O = O_f$ is equal to the union of all open subsets $U$ of $X$ such that the restriction $f\big\vert_U : U \to Y$ is an injective map.) If every fiber of $f$ is a discrete subspace of $X$ then this open set $O$ is necessarily a dense subset of $X.$ In particular, if $X \neq \varnothing$ then $O \neq \varnothing;$ a conclusion that may be false without the assumption that $f$'s fibers are discrete (see this footnote (Note: Consider the continuous open surjection $f : \R \times \R \to \R$ defined by $f(x, y) = x.$ The set $O = O_f$ for this map is the empty set; that is, there does not exist any non-empty open subset $U$ of $\R \times \R$ for which the restriction $f\big\vert_U : U \to \R$ is an injective map.) for an example). One corollary is that every continuous open surjection $f$ between completely metrizable second-countable spaces that has discrete fibers is "almost everywhere" a local homeomorphism (in the topological sense that $O_f$ is a dense open subset of its domain). For example, the map $f : \R \to [0, \infty)$ defined by the polynomial $f(x) = x^2$ is a continuous open surjection with discrete fibers so this result guarantees that the maximal open subset $O_f$ is dense in $\R;$ with additional effort (using the inverse function theorem for instance), it can be shown that $O_f = \R \setminus \{0\},$ which confirms that this set is indeed dense in $\R.$ This example also shows that it is possible for $O_f$ to be a proper dense subset of $f$'s domain. Because every fiber of every non-constant polynomial is finite (and thus a discrete, and even compact, subspace), this example generalizes to such polynomials whenever the mapping induced by it is an open map. (Note: And even if the polynomial function is not an open map, then this theorem may nevertheless still be applied (possibly multiple times) to restrictions of the function to appropriately chosen subsets of the domain (based on consideration of the map's local minimums/maximums).)

== Properties ==
A map $f : X \to Y$ is a local homeomorphism if and only if it is continuous, open, and locally injective (the latter means that every point in $X$ has a neighborhood $N$ such that the restriction of $f$ to $N$ is injective). It follows that the map $f$ is a homeomorphism if and only if it is a bijective local homeomorphism.

Every fiber of a local homeomorphism $f : X \to Y$ is a discrete subspace of its domain $X.$

Whether or not a function is a local homeomorphism depends on its codomain: A map $f : X \to Y$ is a local homeomorphism if and only if the surjection $f : X \to f(X)$ is a local homeomorphism (where $f(X)$ has the subspace topology inherited from $Y$) and $f(X)$ is an open subset of $Y.$

=== Local homeomorphisms and composition of functions ===
The composition of two local homeomorphisms is a local homeomorphism; explicitly, if $f : X \to Y$ and $g : Y \to Z$ are local homeomorphisms then the composition $g \circ f : X \to Z$ is also a local homeomorphism. The restriction of a local homeomorphism to any open subset of the domain will again be a local homeomorphism; explicitly, if $f : X \to Y$ is a local homeomorphism then its restriction $f\big\vert_U : U \to Y$ to any $U$ open subset of $X$ is also a local homeomorphism.

If $f : X \to Y$ is continuous while both $g : Y \to Z$ and $g \circ f : X \to Z$ are local homeomorphisms, then $f$ is also a local homeomorphism.

=== Preserved properties ===
A local homeomorphism $f : X \to Y$ transfers "local" topological properties in both directions:

- $X$ is locally connected if and only if $f(X)$ is;
- $X$ is locally path-connected if and only if $f(X)$ is;
- $X$ is locally compact if and only if $f(X)$ is;
- $X$ is first-countable if and only if $f(X)$ is.

As pointed out above, the Hausdorff property is not local in this sense and need not be preserved by local homeomorphisms.

=== Sheaves ===
The local homeomorphisms with codomain $Y$ stand in a natural one-to-one correspondence with the sheaves of sets on $Y;$ this correspondence is in fact an equivalence of categories. Furthermore, every continuous map with codomain $Y$ gives rise to a uniquely defined local homeomorphism with codomain $Y$ in a natural way. All of this is explained in detail in the article on sheaves.

== Generalizations and analogous concepts ==
The idea of a local homeomorphism can be formulated in geometric settings different from that of topological spaces. For differentiable manifolds, we obtain the local diffeomorphisms; for schemes, we have the formally étale morphisms and the étale morphisms; and for toposes, we get the étale geometric morphisms.

== See also ==
- Diffeomorphism – Isomorphism of differentiable manifolds
- Homeomorphism – Mapping which preserves all topological properties of a given space
- Isomorphism – In mathematics, invertible homomorphism
- Invariance of domain – Theorem in topology about homeomorphic subsets of Euclidean space
- Local diffeomorphism
- Locally Hausdorff space – Space such that every point has a Hausdorff neighborhood
- Non-Hausdorff manifold
