= Preimage theorem =

On the preimage of points in a manifold under the action of a smooth map

In mathematics, particularly in the field of differential topology, the preimage theorem, or regular value theorem, is a variation of the implicit function theorem concerning the preimage of particular points in a smooth manifold under the action of a smooth map.

== Statement of Theorem ==
Definition. Let $X$ and $Y$ be smooth manifolds, and let $f : X \to Y$ be smooth. We say that a point $y \in Y$ is a regular value of $f$ if for all $x \in f^{-1}(y)$ the differential $d f_x: T_x X \to T_y Y$ is surjective. Here, $T_x X$ and $T_y Y$ are the tangent spaces of $X$ and $Y$ at the points $x$ and $y.$ A submanifold $S\subseteq X$ is called smoothly embedded if the inclusion map $\iota: S\hookrightarrow X$ is a smooth embedding, and properly embedded if $\iota$ is a proper map.

Theorem. Let $X$ and $Y$ be smooth manifolds, and let $f : X \to Y$ be smooth. If $y \in Y$ is a regular value of $f$, then $S=f^{-1}(y)$ is a smoothly and properly embedded submanifold of $X.$ In addition, the codimension of $S$ is equal to the dimension of $Y$, and if $x\in S$, then $T_xS=\ker(df_x)$, where $\ker(df_x)$ is the kernel of the differential of $f$ at $x$.

There is also a complex version of this theorem:

Theorem. Let $X^n$ and $Y^m$ be two complex manifolds of complex dimensions $n > m.$ Let $g : X \to Y$ be a holomorphic map and let $y \in \text{im}(g)$ be such that $\text{rank}(dg_x) = m$ for all $x \in g^{-1}(y).$ Then $g^{-1}(y)$ is a complex submanifold of $X$ of complex dimension $n - m.$

== See also ==
- Fiber (mathematics) – Class of points in a function's domain defined by having the same image by that map
- Level set – Subset of a function's domain on which its value is equal
