= Perfect map =

Continuous closed surjective map, each of whose fibers are also compact sets

In mathematics, especially topology, a perfect map is a particular kind of continuous function between topological spaces. Perfect maps are weaker than homeomorphisms, but strong enough to preserve some topological properties such as local compactness that are not always preserved by continuous maps.

== Formal definition ==
Let $X$ and $Y$ be topological spaces and let $p$ be a map from $X$ to $Y$ that is continuous, closed, surjective and such that each fiber $p^{-1}(y)$ is compact relative to $X$ for each $y$ in $Y$. Then $p$ is known as a perfect map.

== Examples and properties ==
1. If $p\colon X \to Y$ is a perfect map and $Y$ is compact, then $X$ is compact.
2. If $p\colon X \to Y$ is a perfect map and $X$ is regular, then $Y$ is regular. (If $p$ is merely continuous, then even if $X$ is regular, $Y$ need not be regular. An example of this is if $X$ is a regular space and $Y$ is an infinite set in the indiscrete topology.)
3. If $p\colon X \to Y$ is a perfect map and if $X$ is locally compact, then $Y$ is locally compact.
4. If $p\colon X \to Y$ is a perfect map and if $X$ is second countable, then $Y$ is second countable.
5. Every injective perfect map is a homeomorphism. This follows from the fact that a bijective closed map has a continuous inverse.
6. If $p\colon X \to Y$ is a perfect map and if $Y$ is connected, then $X$ need not be connected. For example, the constant map from a compact disconnected space to a singleton space is a perfect map.
7. A perfect map need not be open. Indeed, consider the map $p\colon [1, 2] \cup [3, 4] \to [1, 3]$ given by $p(x) = x$ if $x\in [1, 2]$ and $p(x) = x - 1$ if $x\in{}[3, 4]$. This map is closed, continuous (by the pasting lemma), and surjective and therefore is a perfect map (the other condition is trivially satisfied). However, p is not open, for the image of [1, 2] under p is [1, 2] which is not open relative to [1, 3] (the range of p). Note that this map is a quotient map and the quotient operation is 'gluing' two intervals together.
8. Notice how, to preserve properties such as local connectedness, second countability, local compactness etc. ... the map must be not only continuous but also open. A perfect map need not be open (see previous example), but these properties are still preserved under perfect maps.
9. Every homeomorphism is a perfect map. This follows from the fact that a bijective open map is closed and that since a homeomorphism is injective, the inverse of each element of the range must be finite in the domain (in fact, the inverse must have precisely one element).
10. Every perfect map is a quotient map. This follows from the fact that a closed, continuous surjective map is always a quotient map.
11. Let G be a compact topological group which acts continuously on X. Then the quotient map from X to X/G is a perfect map.
12. Perfect maps are proper. Surjective proper maps are perfect, provided the topology of Y is Hausdorff and compactly generated.

== See also ==
- Open and closed maps – A function that sends open (resp. closed) subsets to open (resp. closed) subsets
- Quotient space – Topological space construction
- Proper map – Map between topological spaces with the property that the preimage of every compact is compact
