= Pytkeev space =

Mathematics concept

In mathematics, and especially topology, a Pytkeev space is a topological space that satisfies qualities more subtle than a convergence of a sequence. They are named after E. G. Pytkeev, who proved in 1983 that sequential spaces have this property.

== Definitions ==
Let X be a topological space. For a subset S of X let S̅ denote the closure of S. Then a point x is called a Pytkeev point if for every set A with x ∈ A̅ \ {x̅}, there is a countable $\pi$-net of infinite subsets of A. A Pytkeev space is a space in which every point is a Pytkeev point.

== Examples ==
- Every sequential space is also a Pytkeev space. This is because, if x ∈ A̅ \ {x̅} then there exists a sequence {a_{k}} that converges to x. So take the countable π-net of infinite subsets of A to be {A_{k}} = {a_{k}, a_{k+1}, a_{k+2}, …}.
- If X is a Pytkeev space, then it is also a Weakly Fréchet–Urysohn space.
