= Open and closed maps =

Functions that send open (resp. closed) subsets to open (resp. closed) subsets

In mathematics, more specifically in topology, an open map is a function between two topological spaces that maps open sets to open sets. That is, a function $f : X \to Y$ is open if for any open set $U$ in $X,$ the image $f(U)$ is open in $Y.$ Likewise, a closed map is a function that maps closed sets to closed sets. A map may be open, closed, both, or neither; in particular, an open map need not be closed and vice versa.

Open and closed maps are not necessarily continuous. Further, continuity is independent of openness and closedness in the general case and a continuous function may have one, both, or neither property; this fact remains true even if one restricts oneself to metric spaces. Although their definitions seem more natural, open and closed maps are much less important than continuous maps. Recall that, by definition, a function $f : X \to Y$ is continuous if and only if the preimage of every open set of $Y$ is open in $X.$ (Equivalently, if and only if the preimage of every closed set of $Y$ is closed in $X$).

Early study of open maps was pioneered by Simion Stoilow and Gordon Thomas Whyburn.

== Definitions and characterizations ==
If $S$ is a subset of a topological space then let $\overline{S}$ and $\operatorname{Cl} S$ (resp. $\operatorname{Int} S$) denote the closure (resp. interior) of $S$ in that space. Let $f : X \to Y$ be a function between topological spaces. If $S$ is any set then $f(S) := \left\{ f(s) ~:~ s \in S \cap \operatorname{domain} f \right\}$ is called the image of $S$ under $f.$

=== Competing definitions ===
There are two different competing, but closely related, definitions of "open map" that are widely used, where both of these definitions can be summarized as: "it is a map that sends open sets to open sets." The following terminology is sometimes used to distinguish between the two definitions.

A map $f : X \to Y$ is called a

- "Strongly open map" if whenever $U$ is an open subset of the domain $X$ then $f(U)$ is an open subset of $f$'s codomain $Y.$
- "Relatively open map" if whenever $U$ is an open subset of the domain $X$ then $f(U)$ is an open subset of $f$'s image $\operatorname{Im} f := f(X),$ where as usual, this set is endowed with the subspace topology induced on it by $f$'s codomain $Y.$

Every strongly open map is a relatively open map. However, these definitions are not equivalent in general.

Warning: Many authors define "open map" to mean "relatively open map" (for example, The Encyclopedia of Mathematics) while others define "open map" to mean "strongly open map". In general, these definitions are not equivalent so it is thus advisable to always check what definition of "open map" an author is using.

A surjective map is relatively open if and only if it is strongly open; so for this important special case the definitions are equivalent. More generally, a map $f : X \to Y$ is relatively open if and only if the surjection $f : X \to f(X)$ is a strongly open map.

Because $X$ is always an open subset of $X,$ the image $f(X) = \operatorname{Im} f$ of a strongly open map $f : X \to Y$ must be an open subset of its codomain $Y.$ In fact, a relatively open map is a strongly open map if and only if its image is an open subset of its codomain. In summary,

A map is strongly open if and only if it is relatively open and its image is an open subset of its codomain.

By using this characterization, it is often straightforward to apply results involving one of these two definitions of "open map" to a situation involving the other definition.

The discussion above will also apply to closed maps if each instance of the word "open" is replaced with the word "closed".

=== Open maps ===
A map $f : X \to Y$ is called an open map or a strongly open map if it satisfies any of the following equivalent conditions:

1. Definition: $f : X \to Y$ maps open subsets of its domain to open subsets of its codomain; that is, for any open subset $U$ of $X$, $f(U)$ is an open subset of $Y.$
2. $f : X \to Y$ is a relatively open map and its image $\operatorname{Im} f := f(X)$ is an open subset of its codomain $Y.$
3. For every $x \in X$ and every neighborhood $N$ of $x$ (however small), $f(N)$ is a neighborhood of $f(x)$. We can replace the first or both instances of the word "neighborhood" with "open neighborhood" in this condition and the result will still be an equivalent condition:
  - For every $x \in X$ and every open neighborhood $N$ of $x$, $f(N)$ is a neighborhood of $f(x)$.
  - For every $x \in X$ and every open neighborhood $N$ of $x$, $f(N)$ is an open neighborhood of $f(x)$.
4. $f\left( \operatorname{Int}_X A \right) \subseteq \operatorname{Int}_Y ( f(A) )$ for all subsets $A$ of $X,$ where $\operatorname{Int}$ denotes the topological interior of the set.
5. Whenever $C$ is a closed subset of $X$ then the set $\left\{ y \in Y ~:~ f^{-1}(y) \subseteq C \right\}$ is a closed subset of $Y.$
  - This is a consequence of the identity $f(X \setminus R) = Y \setminus \left\{ y \in Y : f^{-1}(y) \subseteq R \right\},$ which holds for all subsets $R \subseteq X.$

If $\mathcal{B}$ is a basis for $X$ then the following can be appended to this list:

6. $f$ maps basic open sets to open sets in its codomain (that is, for any basic open set $B \in \mathcal{B},$ $f(B)$ is an open subset of $Y$).

=== Closed maps ===
A map $f : X \to Y$ is called a relatively closed map if whenever $C$ is a closed subset of the domain $X$ then $f(C)$ is a closed subset of $f$'s image $\operatorname{Im} f := f(X),$ where as usual, this set is endowed with the subspace topology induced on it by $f$'s codomain $Y.$

A map $f : X \to Y$ is called a closed map or a strongly closed map if it satisfies any of the following equivalent conditions:

1. Definition: $f : X \to Y$ maps closed subsets of its domain to closed subsets of its codomain; that is, for any closed subset $C$ of $X,$ $f(C)$ is a closed subset of $Y.$
2. $f : X \to Y$ is a relatively closed map and its image $\operatorname{Im} f := f(X)$ is a closed subset of its codomain $Y.$
3. $\overline{f(A)} \subseteq f\left(\overline{A}\right)$ for every subset $A \subseteq X.$
4. $\overline{f(C)} \subseteq f(C)$ for every closed subset $C \subseteq X.$
5. Whenever $U$ is an open subset of $X$ then the set $\left\{y \in Y ~:~ f^{-1}(y) \subseteq U\right\}$ is an open subset of $Y.$
6. If $x_{\bull}$ is a net in $X$ and $y \in Y$ is a point such that $f\left(x_{\bull}\right) \to y$ in $Y,$ then $x_{\bull}$ converges in $X$ to the set $f^{-1}(y).$
  - The convergence $x_{\bull} \to f^{-1}(y)$ means that every open subset of $X$ that contains $f^{-1}(y)$ will contain $x_j$ for all sufficiently large indices $j.$

A surjective map is strongly closed if and only if it is relatively closed. So for this important special case, the two definitions are equivalent. By definition, the map $f : X \to Y$ is a relatively closed map if and only if the surjection $f : X \to \operatorname{Im} f$ is a strongly closed map.

If in the open set definition of "continuous map" (which is the statement: "every preimage of an open set is open"), both instances of the word "open" are replaced with "closed" then the statement that results ("every preimage of a closed set is closed") is equivalent to continuity. This does not happen with the definition of "open map" (which is: "every image of an open set is open") since the statement that results ("every image of a closed set is closed") is the definition of "closed map", which is in general not equivalent to openness. There exist open maps that are not closed and there also exist closed maps that are not open. This difference between open/closed maps and continuous maps is ultimately due to the fact that for any set $S,$ only $f(X \setminus S) \supseteq f(X) \setminus f(S)$ is guaranteed in general, whereas for preimages, equality $f^{-1}(Y \setminus S) = f^{-1}(Y) \setminus f^{-1}(S)$ always holds.

== Examples ==
The function $f : \R \to \R$ defined by $f(x) = x^2$ is continuous, closed, and relatively open, but not (strongly) open. This is because if $U = (a, b)$ is any open interval in $f$'s domain $\R$ that does not contain $0$ then $f(U) = (\min \{ a^2, b^2 \}, \max \{ a^2, b^2 \}),$ where this open interval is an open subset of both $\R$ and $\operatorname{Im} f := f(\R) = [0, \infty).$ However, if $U = (a, b)$ is any open interval in $\R$ that contains $0$ then $f(U) = [0, \max \{ a^2, b^2 \}),$ which is not an open subset of $f$'s codomain $\R$ but is an open subset of $\operatorname{Im} f = [0, \infty).$ Because the set of all open intervals in $\R$ is a basis for the Euclidean topology on $\R,$ this shows that $f : \R \to \R$ is relatively open but not (strongly) open.

If $Y$ has the discrete topology (that is, all subsets are open and closed) then every function $f : X \to Y$ is both open and closed (but not necessarily continuous). For example, the floor function from $\R$ to $\Z$ is open and closed, but not continuous. This example shows that the image of a connected space under an open or closed map need not be connected.

Whenever we have a product of topological spaces $X=\prod X_i,$ the natural projections $p_i : X \to X_i$ are open (as well as continuous). Since the projections of fiber bundles and covering maps are locally natural projections of products, these are also open maps. Projections need not be closed, however. Consider for instance the projection $p_1 : \R^2 \to \R$ on the first component; then the set $A = \{(x, 1/x) : x \neq 0\}$ is closed in $\R^2,$ but $p_1(A) = \R \setminus \{0\}$ is not closed in $\R.$ However, for a compact space $Y,$ the projection $X \times Y \to X$ is closed. This is essentially the tube lemma.

To every point on the unit circle we can associate the angle of the positive $x$-axis with the ray connecting the point with the origin. This function from the unit circle to the half-open interval [0,2π) is bijective, open, and closed, but not continuous. It shows that the image of a compact space under an open or closed map need not be compact. Also note that if we consider this as a function from the unit circle to the real numbers, then it is neither open nor closed. Specifying the codomain is essential.

== Sufficient conditions ==
Every homeomorphism is open, closed, and continuous. In fact, a continuous bijection is a homeomorphism if and only if it is open, or equivalently, if and only if it is closed.

The composition of two (strongly) open maps is an open map and the composition of two (strongly) closed maps is a closed map. However, the composition of two relatively open maps need not be relatively open and the composition of two relatively closed maps need not be relatively closed. If $f : X \to Y$ is strongly open (respectively, strongly closed) and $g : Y \to Z$ is relatively open (respectively, relatively closed), then $g \circ f : X \to Z$ is relatively open (respectively, relatively closed).

Let $f : X \to Y$ be a map. Given any subset $T \subseteq Y$, if $f$ is relatively open (respectively, relatively closed, strongly open, strongly closed, continuous, surjective), then the same is true of its restriction
$$f\big\vert_{f^{-1}(T)} ~:~ f^{-1}(T) \to T$$
to the $f$-saturated subset $f^{-1}(T)$.

The categorical sum of two open maps is open, and of two closed maps is closed. The categorical product of two open maps is also open. However, the categorical product of two closed maps need not be closed.

A bijective map is open if and only if it is closed. The inverse of a continuous bijection is an open and closed bijection (and vice versa). An open surjection is not necessarily closed, and a closed surjection is not necessarily open. All local homeomorphisms, including all coordinate charts on manifolds and all covering maps, are open maps.

Closed map lemma—Every continuous function $f : X \to Y$ from a compact space $X$ to a Hausdorff space $Y$ is closed and proper (meaning that preimages of compact sets are compact).

A variant of the closed map lemma states that if a continuous function between locally compact Hausdorff spaces is proper, then it is also closed.

In complex analysis, the identically named open mapping theorem states that every non-constant holomorphic function defined on a connected open subset of the complex plane is an open map.

The invariance of domain theorem states that a continuous and locally injective function between two $n$-dimensional topological manifolds must be open.

Invariance of domain—If $U$ is an open subset of $\R^n$ and $f : U \to \R^n$ is an injective continuous map, then $V := f(U)$ is open in $\R^n$ and $f$ is a homeomorphism between $U$ and $V$.

In functional analysis, the open mapping theorem states that every continuous linear surjection between Banach spaces is an open map. This theorem has been generalized to topological vector spaces beyond just Banach spaces.

A surjective map $f : X \to Y$ is called an almost open map if, for every $y \in Y$, there exists some $x \in f^{-1}(y)$ such that $x$ is a point of openness for $f$ which by definition means that, for every open neighborhood $U$ of $x$, $f(U)$ is a neighborhood of $f(x)$ in $Y$ (note that the neighborhood $f(U)$ is not required to be an open neighborhood). Every open surjection is an almost open map, but the converse is false. If a surjection $f : (X, \tau) \to (Y, \sigma)$ is an almost open map, then it is an open map if it satisfies the following condition (a condition that does not depend in any way on $Y$'s topology $\sigma$): whenever $m$ and $n \in X$ belong to the same fiber of $f$ (that is, $f(m) = f(n)$), then, for every neighborhood $U \in \tau$ of $m$, there exists some neighborhood $V \in \tau$ of $n$ such that $F(V) \subseteq F(U)$. If the map is continuous, then the above condition is also necessary for the map to be open. That is, if $f : X \to Y$ is a continuous surjection, then it is open if and only if it is almost open and it satisfies the above condition.

== Properties ==
=== Open or closed maps that are continuous ===
If $f : X \to Y$ is a continuous map that is also open or closed, then:

- if $f$ is a surjection, then it is a quotient map and even a hereditarily quotient map,
  - A surjective map $f : X \to Y$ is called hereditarily quotient if for every subset $T \subseteq Y$, the restriction $f\big\vert_{f^{-1}(T)} ~:~ f^{-1}(T) \to T$ is a quotient map.
- if $f$ is an injection, then it is a topological embedding.
- if $f$ is a bijection, then it is a homeomorphism.

In the first two cases, being open or closed is merely a sufficient condition for the conclusion that follows. In the third case, it is necessary as well.

=== Open continuous maps ===
If $f : X \to Y$ is a continuous (strongly) open map, $A \subseteq X,$ and $S \subseteq Y,$ then:

- $f^{-1}\left(\operatorname{Bd}_Y S\right) = \operatorname{Bd}_X \left(f^{-1}(S)\right)$ where $\operatorname{Bd}$ denotes the boundary of a set.
- $f^{-1}\left(\overline{S}\right) = \overline{f^{-1}(S)}$ where $\overline{S}$ denote the closure of a set.
- If $\overline{A} = \overline{\operatorname{Int}_X A},$ where $\operatorname{Int}$ denotes the interior of a set, then
  $$\overline{\operatorname{Int}_Y f(A)} = \overline{f(A)} = \overline{f\left(\operatorname{Int}_X A\right)} = \overline{f \left(\overline{\operatorname{Int}_X A}\right)}$$
  where this set $\overline{f(A)}$ is also necessarily a regular closed set (in $Y$). (Note: A subset $S \subseteq X$ is called a regular closed set if $\overline{\operatorname{Int} S} = S$ or equivalently, if $\operatorname{Bd} \left( \operatorname{Int} S \right) = \operatorname{Bd} S,$ where $\operatorname{Bd} S$ (resp. $\operatorname{Int} S,$ $\overline{S}$) denotes the topological boundary (resp. interior, closure) of $S$ in $X.$ The set $S$ is called a regular open set if $\operatorname{Int} \left( \overline{S} \right) = S$ or equivalently, if $\operatorname{Bd} \left( \overline{S} \right) = \operatorname{Bd} S.$ The interior (taken in $X$) of a closed subset of $X$ is always a regular open subset of $X.$ The closure (taken in $X$) of an open subset of $X$ is always a regular closed subset of $X.$) In particular, if $A$ is a regular closed set, then so is $\overline{f(A)}$. If $A$ is a regular open set, then so is $Y \setminus \overline{f(X \setminus A)}.$
- If the continuous open map $f : X \to Y$ is also surjective, then $\operatorname{Int}_X f^{-1}(S) = f^{-1}\left(\operatorname{Int}_Y S\right)$ and, moreover, $S$ is a regular open (resp. a regular closed) subset of $Y$ if and only if $f^{-1}(S)$ is a regular open (resp. a regular closed) subset of $X$.
- If a net $y_{\bull} = \left(y_i\right)_{i \in I}$ converges in $Y$ to a point $y \in Y$ and if the continuous open map $f : X \to Y$ is surjective, then, for any $x \in f^{-1}(y)$, there exists a net $x_{\bull} = \left(x_a\right)_{a \in A}$ in $X$ (indexed by some directed set $A$) such that $x_{\bull} \to x$ in $X$ and $f\left(x_{\bull}\right) := \left(f\left(x_a\right)\right)_{a \in A}$ is a subnet of $y_{\bull}$. Moreover, the indexing set $A$ may be taken to be $A := I \times \mathcal{N}_x$ with the product order, where $\mathcal{N}_x$ is any neighbourhood basis of $x$ directed by $\,\supseteq.\,$ (Note: Explicitly, for any $a := (i, U) \in A := I \times \mathcal{N}_x,$ pick any $h_a \in I$ such that $i \leq h_a \text{ and } y_{h_a} \in f(U)$, and then let $x_a \in U \cap f^{-1}\left(y_{h_a}\right)$ be arbitrary. The assignment $a \mapsto h_a$ defines an order morphism $h : A \to I$ such that $h(A)$ is a cofinal subset of $I$. Thus, $f\left(x_{\bull}\right)$ is a Willard-subnet of $y_{\bull}.$)

== See also ==
- Almost open map – Map that satisfies a condition similar to that of being an open map
- Closed graph – Property of functions in topology
- Closed linear operator – Linear operator whose graph is closed
- Local homeomorphism – Mathematical function revertible near each point
- Quasi-open map – Generalization of open map in topology
- Quotient map (topology) – Topological space construction
- Perfect map – Continuous closed surjective map, each of whose fibers are also compact sets
- Proper map – Mathematical map between topological spaces
- Sequence covering map
