= Fixed-point space =

Space where all functions have fixed points

In mathematics, a Hausdorff space X is called a fixed-point space if it obeys a fixed-point theorem, according to which every continuous function $f:X\rightarrow X$ has a fixed point, a point $x$ for which $f(x)=x$.

For example, the closed unit interval is a fixed point space, as can be proved from the intermediate value theorem. The real line is not a fixed-point space, because the continuous function that adds one to its argument does not have a fixed point. Generalizing the unit interval, by the Brouwer fixed-point theorem, every compact bounded convex set in a Euclidean space is a fixed-point space.

The definition of a fixed-point space can also be extended from continuous functions on topological spaces to other classes of maps on other types of space.
