= Quasitopological space =

Function in topology

In mathematics, a quasi-topology on a set X is a function that associates to every compact Hausdorff space C a collection of mappings from C to X satisfying certain natural conditions. A set with a quasi-topology is called a quasitopological space.

They were introduced by Edwin Spanier, who showed that there is a natural quasi-topology on the space of continuous maps from one space to another.
