= Invariance of domain =

Theorem in topology about homeomorphic subsets of Euclidean space

Invariance of domain is a theorem in topology about homeomorphic subsets of Euclidean space $\R^n$. It states:

If $U$ is an open subset of $\R^n$ and $f : U \rarr \R^n$ is an injective continuous map, then $V := f(U)$ is open in $\R^n$ and $f$ is a homeomorphism between $U$ and $V$.

The theorem and its proof are due to L. E. J. Brouwer, published in 1912. The proof uses tools of algebraic topology, notably the Brouwer fixed point theorem.

== Notes ==
The conclusion of the theorem can equivalently be formulated as: "$f$ is an open map".

Normally, to check that $f$ is a homeomorphism, one would have to verify that both $f$ and its inverse function $f^{-1}$ are continuous; the theorem says that if the domain is an open subset of $\R^n$ and the image is also in $\R^n,$ then continuity of $f^{-1}$ is automatic. Furthermore, the theorem says that if two subsets $U$ and $V$ of $\R^n$ are homeomorphic, and $U$ is open, then $V$ must be open as well. (Note that $V$ is open as a subset of $\R^n,$ and not just in the subspace topology. Openness of $V$ in the subspace topology is automatic.) Both of these statements are not at all obvious and are not generally true if one leaves Euclidean space.

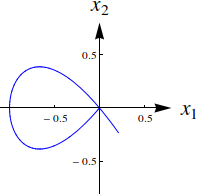
An injective map which is not a homeomorphism onto its image: $g : (-1.1, 1) \to \R^2$ with $g(t) = \left(t^2 - 1, t^3 - t\right).$

It is of crucial importance that both domain and image of $f$ are contained in Euclidean space of the same dimension. Consider for instance the map $f : (0, 1) \to \R^2$ defined by $f(t) = (t, 0).$ This map is injective and continuous, the domain is an open subset of $\R$, but the image is not open in $\R^2.$ A more extreme example is the map $g : (-1.1, 1) \to \R^2$ defined by $g(t) = \left(t^2 - 1, t^3 - t\right)$ because here $g$ is injective and continuous but does not even yield a homeomorphism onto its image.

The theorem is also not generally true in infinitely many dimensions. Consider for instance the Banach L^{p} space $\ell^{\infty}$ of all bounded real sequences. Define $f : \ell^\infty \to \ell^\infty$ as the shift $f\left(x_1, x_2, \ldots\right) = \left(0, x_1, x_2, \ldots\right).$ Then $f$ is injective and continuous, the domain is open in $\ell^{\infty}$, but the image is not.

== Consequences ==
If $n>m$, there exists no continuous injective map $f:U\to\R^m$ for a nonempty open set $U\subseteq\R^n$. To see this, suppose there exists such a map $f.$ Composing $f$ with the standard inclusion of $\R^m$ into $\R^n$ would give a continuous injection from $\R^n$ to itself, but with an image with empty interior in $\R^n$. This would contradict invariance of domain.

In particular, if $n\ne m$, no nonempty open subset of $\R^n$ can be homeomorphic to an open subset of $\R^m$.

And $\R^n$ is not homeomorphic to $\R^m$ if $n\ne m.$

== Generalizations ==
The domain invariance theorem may be generalized to manifolds: if $M$ and $N$ are topological n-manifolds without boundary and $f : M \to N$ is a continuous map which is locally one-to-one (meaning that every point in $M$ has a neighborhood such that $f$ restricted to this neighborhood is injective), then $f$ is an open map (meaning that $f(U)$ is open in $N$ whenever $U$ is an open subset of $M$) and a local homeomorphism.

There are also generalizations to certain types of continuous maps from a Banach space to itself.

== See also ==
- Open mapping theorem for other conditions that ensure that a given continuous map is open.
