= Non-Hausdorff manifold =

Generalization of manifolds

In geometry and topology, it is a usual axiom of a manifold to be a Hausdorff space. In general topology, this axiom is relaxed, and one studies non-Hausdorff manifolds: spaces locally homeomorphic to Euclidean space, but not necessarily Hausdorff.

== Examples ==
=== Line with two origins ===
The most familiar non-Hausdorff manifold is the line with two origins, or bug-eyed line. This is the quotient space of two copies of the real line, $\R \times \{a\}$ and $\R \times \{b\}$ (with $a \neq b$), obtained by identifying points $(x,a)$ and $(x,b)$ whenever $x \neq 0.$

An equivalent description of the space is to take the real line $\R$ and replace the origin $0$ with two origins $0_a$ and $0_b.$ The subspace $\R\setminus\{0\}$ retains its usual Euclidean topology. And a local base of open neighborhoods at each origin $0_i$ is formed by the sets $(U\setminus\{0\})\cup\{0_i\}$ with $U$ an open neighborhood of $0$ in $\R.$

For each origin $0_i$ the subspace obtained from $\R$ by replacing $0$ with $0_i$ is an open neighborhood of $0_i$ homeomorphic to $\R.$ Since every point has a neighborhood homeomorphic to the Euclidean line, the space is locally Euclidean. In particular, it is locally Hausdorff, in the sense that each point has a Hausdorff neighborhood. But the space is not Hausdorff, as every neighborhood of $0_a$ intersects every neighbourhood of $0_b.$ It is however a T_{1} space.

The space is second countable.

The space exhibits several phenomena that do not happen in Hausdorff spaces:

- The space is path connected but not arc connected. In particular, to get a path from one origin to the other one can first move left from $0_a$ to $-1$ within the line through the first origin, and then move back to the right from $-1$ to $0_b$ within the line through the second origin. But it is impossible to join the two origins with an arc, which is an injective path; intuitively, if one moves first to the left, one has to eventually backtrack and move back to the right.
- The intersection of two compact sets need not be compact. For example, the sets $[-1,0)\cup\{0_a\}$ and $[-1,0)\cup\{0_b\}$ are compact, but their intersection $[-1,0)$ is not.
- The space is locally compact in the sense that every point has a local base of compact neighborhoods. But the line through one origin does not contain a closed neighborhood of that origin, as any neighborhood of one origin contains the other origin in its closure. So the space is not a regular space, and even though every point has at least one closed compact neighborhood, the origin points do not admit a local base of closed compact neighborhoods.

The space does not have the homotopy type of a CW-complex, or of any Hausdorff space.

=== Line with many origins ===
The line with many origins is similar to the line with two origins, but with an arbitrary number of origins. It is constructed by taking an arbitrary set $S$ with the discrete topology and taking the quotient space of $\R\times S$ that identifies points $(x,\alpha)$ and $(x,\beta)$ whenever $x\ne 0.$ Equivalently, it can be obtained from $\R$ by replacing the origin $0$ with many origins $0_\alpha,$ one for each $\alpha\in S.$ The neighborhoods of each origin are described as in the two origin case.

If there are infinitely many origins, the space illustrates that the closure of a compact set need not be compact in general. For example, the closure of the compact set $A=[-1,0)\cup\{0_\alpha\}\cup(0,1]$ is the set $A\cup\{0_\beta:\beta\in S\}$ obtained by adding all the origins to $A$, and that closure is not compact. From being locally Euclidean, such a space is locally compact in the sense that every point has a local base of compact neighborhoods. But the origin points do not have any closed compact neighborhood.

=== Branching line ===
Similar to the line with two origins is the branching line.

This is the quotient space of two copies of the real line
$$\R \times \{a\} \quad \text{ and } \quad \R \times \{b\}$$
with the equivalence relation
$$(x, a) \sim (x, b) \quad \text{ if } \; x < 0.$$

This space has a single point for each negative real number $r$ and two points $x_a, x_b$ for every non-negative number: it has a "fork" at zero.

=== Etale space ===
The etale space of a sheaf, such as the sheaf of continuous real functions over a manifold, is a manifold that is often non-Hausdorff. (The etale space is Hausdorff if it is a sheaf of functions with some sort of analytic continuation property.)

== Properties ==
Because non-Hausdorff manifolds are locally homeomorphic to Euclidean space, they are locally metrizable (but not metrizable in general) and locally Hausdorff (but not Hausdorff in general).

== See also ==
- List of topologies – List of concrete topologies and topological spaces
- Locally Hausdorff space – Space such that every point has a Hausdorff neighborhood
- Separation axiom – Axioms in topology defining notions of "separation"
