= Fiber (mathematics) =

Class of points in a function's domain defined by having the same image by that map

In mathematics, a fiber (US English) or fibre (British English) of a map or function $f:X\to Y$ is an equivalence class in X for the relation of having the same image under f. If y is that image, then this fiber equals the inverse image $f^{-1}(y) = \{ x\in X : f(x) = y \}$ of $y$ and is called the fiber of f over y.

== Properties and applications ==
=== In elementary set theory ===
Any map $f:X\to Y$ defines a relation $\equiv_f$ on X, where $x_1\equiv_f x_2$ holds when $f(x_1)=f(x_2)$, and this is always an equivalence relation. The fibers of $f$ are the equivalence classes for this relation $\equiv_f$. Each such fiber is associated to the (by definition constant) value of f on the fiber, and if $y\in Y$ is that value (necessarily an element of the image set of f), then the fiber is the set $f^{-1}(y) = \{ x\in X : f(x) = y\}$ of preimages of y under f, which is called the fiber of f over y. The set of all fibers of f forms is a partition of $X$. The mentioned correspondence defines a bijection from the quotient set $X/{\equiv_f}$ (the set of fibers of f) to the image set $f(X)$. Note that in case $f$ is not a surjective map, one only considers fibers over elements of the subset $f(X)$ of Y, thus avoiding the empty set, which cannot be an element of any partition, among the fibers of f. The fiber containing an element $x\in X$ is the set $f^{-1}(f(x))$.

For example, let $f$ be the function from $\R^2$ to $\R$ that sends point $(a,b)$ to $a+b$. The fiber of 5 under $f$ are all the points on the straight line with equation $a+b=5$. The fibers of $f$ are that line and all the straight lines parallel to it, which form a partition of the plane $\R^2$.

More generally, if $f$ is a linear map from some vector space $X$ to some other vector space $Y$, the fibers of $f$ are affine subspaces of $X$, which are all the translated copies of the null space of $f$.

If $f$ is a real-valued function of several real variables, the fibers of the function are the level sets of $f$. If $f$ is also a continuous function and $y\in\R$ is in the image of $f,$ the level set $f^{-1}(y)$ will typically be a curve in 2D, a surface in 3D, and, more generally, a hypersurface in the domain of $f.$

=== In topology ===
In point set topology, one generally considers functions from topological spaces to topological spaces.

If $f$ is a continuous function and if $Y$ (or more generally, the image set $f(X)$) is a T_{1} space then every fiber is a closed subset of $X.$ In particular, if $f$ is a local homeomorphism from $X$ to $Y$, each fiber of $f$ is a discrete subspace of $X$.

A function between topological spaces is called monotone if every fiber is a connected subspace of its domain. A function $f : \R \to \R$ is monotone in this topological sense if and only if it is non-increasing or non-decreasing, which is the usual meaning of "monotone function" in real analysis.

A function between topological spaces is (sometimes) called a proper map if every fiber is a compact subspace of its domain. However, many authors use other non-equivalent competing definitions of "proper map" so it is advisable to always check how a particular author defines this term. A continuous closed surjective function whose fibers are all compact is called a perfect map.

A fiber bundle is a function $f$ between topological spaces $X$ and $Y$ whose fibers have certain special properties related to the topology of those spaces.

=== In algebraic geometry ===
In algebraic geometry, if $f : X \to Y$ is a morphism of schemes, the fiber of a point $p$ in $Y$ is the fiber product of schemes
$$X \times_Y \operatorname{Spec} k(p)$$
where $k(p)$ is the residue field at $p.$

== See also ==
- Fibration
- Fiber bundle
- Fiber product
- Preimage theorem
- Zero set
