= Axiom of countability =

In mathematics, an axiom of countability is a property of certain mathematical objects that asserts the existence of a countable set with certain properties. Without such an axiom, such a set might not provably exist.

== Important examples ==
Important countability axioms for topological spaces include:

- sequential space: a set is closed if and only if every convergent sequence in the set has its limit point in the set
- first-countable space: every point has a countable neighbourhood basis (local base)
- second-countable space: the topology has a countable base
- separable space: there exists a countable dense subset
- Lindelöf space: every open cover has a countable subcover
- σ-compact space: there exists a countable cover by compact spaces

== Relationships with each other ==
These axioms are related to each other in the following ways:

- Every first-countable space is sequential.
- Every second-countable space is first countable, separable, and Lindelöf.
- Every σ-compact space is Lindelöf.
- Every metric space is first countable.
- For metric spaces, second-countability, separability, and the Lindelöf property are all equivalent.

== Related concepts ==
Other examples of mathematical objects obeying axioms of countability include sigma-finite measure spaces, and lattices of countable type.
