= Locally Hausdorff space =

Space such that every point has a Hausdorff neighborhood

Separation axioms in topological spaces

Kolmogorov classification
- T_{0}: (Kolmogorov)
- T_{1}: (Fréchet)
- T_{2}: (Hausdorff)
- T_{2½}: (Urysohn)
- completely T_{2}: (completely Hausdorff)
- T_{3}: (regular Hausdorff)
- T_{3½}: (Tychonoff)
- T_{4}: (normal Hausdorff)
- T_{5}: (completely normal Hausdorff)
- T_{6}: (perfectly normal Hausdorff)

In mathematics, in the field of topology, a topological space is said to be locally Hausdorff if every point has a neighbourhood that is a Hausdorff space under the subspace topology.

== Examples and sufficient conditions ==
- Every Hausdorff space is locally Hausdorff.
- There are locally Hausdorff spaces where a sequence has more than one limit. This can never happen for a Hausdorff space.
- The line with two origins is locally Hausdorff (it is in fact locally metrizable) but not Hausdorff.
- The etale space for the sheaf of differentiable functions on a differential manifold is not Hausdorff, but it is locally Hausdorff.
- Let $X$ be a set given the particular point topology with particular point $p.$ The space $X$ is locally Hausdorff at $p,$ since $p$ is an isolated point in $X$ and the singleton $\{p\}$ is a Hausdorff neighbourhood of $p.$ For any other point $x,$ any neighbourhood of it contains $p$ and therefore the space is not locally Hausdorff at $x.$

== Properties ==
A space is locally Hausdorff exactly if it can be written as a union of Hausdorff open subspaces. And in a locally Hausdorff space each point belongs to some Hausdorff dense open subspace.

Every locally Hausdorff space is T_{1}. The converse is not true in general. For example, an infinite set with the cofinite topology is a T_{1} space that is not locally Hausdorff.

Every locally Hausdorff space is sober.

If $G$ is a topological group that is locally Hausdorff at some point $x \in G,$ then $G$ is Hausdorff. This follows from the fact that if $y \in G,$ there exists a homeomorphism from $G$ to itself carrying $x$ to $y,$ so $G$ is locally Hausdorff at every point, and is therefore T_{1} (and T_{1} topological groups are Hausdorff).
