= Regular open set =

A subset $S$ of a topological space $X$ is called a regular open set if it is equal to the interior of its closure; expressed symbolically, if $\operatorname{Int}(\overline{S}) = S$ or, equivalently, if $\partial(\overline{S})=\partial S,$ where $\operatorname{Int} S,$ $\overline{S}$ and $\partial S$ denote, respectively, the interior, closure and boundary of $S.$

A subset $S$ of $X$ is called a regular closed set if it is equal to the closure of its interior; expressed symbolically, if $\overline{\operatorname{Int} S} = S$ or, equivalently, if $\partial(\operatorname{Int}S)=\partial S.$

== Examples ==
If $\Reals$ has its usual Euclidean topology then the open set $S = (0,1) \cup (1,2)$ is not a regular open set, since $\operatorname{Int}(\overline{S}) = (0,2) \neq S.$ Every open interval in $\R$ is a regular open set and every non-degenerate closed interval (that is, a closed interval containing at least two distinct points) is a regular closed set. A singleton $\{x\}$ is a closed subset of $\R$ but not a regular closed set because its interior is the empty set $\varnothing,$ so that $\overline{\operatorname{Int} \{x\}} = \overline{\varnothing} = \varnothing \neq \{x\}.$

== Properties ==
A subset of $X$ is a regular open set if and only if its complement in $X$ is a regular closed set. Every regular open set is an open set and every regular closed set is a closed set.

A subset $G$ in a topological space $X$ is a regular open set if and only if $G=\operatorname{Int}(\overline{A})$ for some $A\subset X$. This is a consequence of the maximal and minimal properties of the interior and closure operators which when combined, they lead to

$$\begin{aligned}
\operatorname{Int}(\overline{A})\subset \overline{\operatorname{Int}(\overline{A})} \quad \Longrightarrow \quad \operatorname{Int}(\overline{A})\subset \operatorname{Int}\Big( \overline{\operatorname{Int}(\overline{A})}\Big)
\end{aligned}$$

$$\begin{aligned}
\operatorname{Int}(\overline{A})\subset \overline{A} \quad \Longrightarrow \quad \overline{\operatorname{Int}(\overline{A})}\subset \overline{A}\quad\Longrightarrow\quad
\operatorname{Int}\Big( \overline{\operatorname{Int}(\overline{A})}\Big)\subset \operatorname{Int}(\overline{A})
\end{aligned}$$

Each clopen subset of $X$ (which includes $\varnothing$ and $X$ itself) is simultaneously a regular open subset and regular closed subset.

The intersection (but not necessarily the union) of two regular open sets is a regular open set. Similarly, the union (but not necessarily the intersection) of two regular closed sets is a regular closed set.

The collection of all regular open sets in $X$ forms a complete Boolean algebra; the join operation is given by $U \vee V = \operatorname{Int}(\overline{U \cup V}),$ the meet is $U \and V = U \cap V$ and the complement is $\neg U = \operatorname{Int}(X \setminus U).$

== See also ==
- Regular space – Property of topological space
- Semiregular space
- Separation axiom – Axioms in topology defining notions of "separation"
