= Proper map =

Mathematical map between topological spaces

In mathematics, a function between topological spaces is called proper if inverse images of compact subsets are compact. In algebraic geometry, the analogous concept is called a proper morphism.

== Definition ==
There are several competing definitions of a "proper function". Some authors call a function $f : X \to Y$ between two topological spaces proper if the preimage of every compact set in $Y$ is compact in $X.$ Other authors call a map $f$ proper if it is continuous and closed with compact fibers; that is if it is a continuous closed map and the preimage of every point in $Y$ is compact. The two definitions are equivalent if $Y$ is locally compact and Hausdorff.

Partial proof of equivalence

Let $f : X \to Y$ be a closed map, such that $f^{-1}(y)$ is compact (in $X$) for all $y \in Y.$ Let $K$ be a compact subset of $Y.$ It remains to show that $f^{-1}(K)$ is compact.

Let $\left\{U_a : a \in A\right\}$ be an open cover of $f^{-1}(K).$ Then for all $k \in K$ this is also an open cover of $f^{-1}(k).$ Since the latter is assumed to be compact, it has a finite subcover. In other words, for every $k \in K,$ there exists a finite subset $\gamma_k \subseteq A$ such that $f^{-1}(k) \subseteq \cup_{a \in \gamma_k} U_{a}.$ The set $X \setminus \cup_{a \in \gamma_k} U_{a}$ is closed in $X$ and its image under $f$ is closed in $Y$ because $f$ is a closed map. Hence the set
$$V_k = Y \setminus f\left(X \setminus \cup_{a \in \gamma_k} U_{a}\right)$$
is open in $Y.$ It follows that $V_k$ contains the point $k.$ Now $K \subseteq \cup_{k \in K} V_k$ and because $K$ is assumed to be compact, there are finitely many points $k_1, \dots, k_s$ such that $K \subseteq \cup_{i =1}^s V_{k_i}.$ Furthermore, the set $\Gamma = \cup_{i=1}^s \gamma_{k_i}$ is a finite union of finite sets, which makes $\Gamma$ a finite set.

Now it follows that $f^{-1}(K) \subseteq f^{-1}\left( \cup_{i=1}^s V_{k_i} \right) \subseteq \cup_{a \in \Gamma} U_{a}$ and we have found a finite subcover of $f^{-1}(K),$ which completes the proof.

If $X$ is Hausdorff and $Y$ is locally compact Hausdorff then proper is equivalent to universally closed. A map is universally closed if for any topological space $Z$ the map $f \times \operatorname{id}_Z : X \times Z \to Y \times Z$ is closed. In the case that $Y$ is Hausdorff, this is equivalent to requiring that for any map $Z \to Y$ the pullback $X \times_Y Z \to Z$ be closed, as follows from the fact that $X \times_YZ$ is a closed subspace of $X \times Z.$

An equivalent, possibly more intuitive definition when $X$ and $Y$ are metric spaces is as follows: we say an infinite sequence of points $\{p_i\}$ in a topological space $X$ escapes to infinity if, for every compact set $S \subseteq X$ only finitely many points $p_i$ are in $S.$ Then a continuous map $f : X \to Y$ is proper if and only if for every sequence of points $\left\{p_i\right\}$ that escapes to infinity in $X,$ the sequence $\left\{f\left(p_i\right)\right\}$ escapes to infinity in $Y.$

== Properties ==
- Every continuous map from a compact space to a Hausdorff space is both proper and closed.
- Every surjective proper map is a compact covering map.
  - A map $f : X \to Y$ is called a compact covering if for every compact subset $K \subseteq Y$ there exists some compact subset $C \subseteq X$ such that $f(C) = K.$
- A topological space is compact if and only if the map from that space to a single point is proper.
- If $f : X \to Y$ is a proper continuous map and $Y$ is a compactly generated Hausdorff space (this includes Hausdorff spaces that are either first-countable or locally compact), then $f$ is closed.

== Generalization ==
It is possible to generalize the notion of proper maps of topological spaces to locales and topoi, see (Johnstone 2002).

== See also ==
- Almost open map – Map that satisfies a condition similar to that of being an open map
- Open and closed maps – A function that sends open (resp. closed) subsets to open (resp. closed) subsets
- Perfect map – Continuous closed surjective map, each of whose fibers are also compact sets
- Topology glossary
