= Sequential space =

Topological space characterized by sequences

In topology and related fields of mathematics, a sequential space is a topological space whose topology can be completely characterized by its convergent/divergent sequences. They can be thought of as spaces that satisfy a very weak axiom of countability, and all first-countable spaces (notably metric spaces) are sequential.

In any topological space $(X, \tau),$ if a convergent sequence is contained in a closed set $C,$ then any limit of that sequence must be contained in $C$ as well. Sets with this property are known as sequentially closed. Sequential spaces are precisely those topological spaces for which sequentially closed sets are in fact closed. (These definitions can also be rephrased in terms of sequentially open sets; see below.) Said differently, any topology can be described in terms of nets (also known as Moore–Smith sequences), but those sequences may be "too long" (indexed by too large an ordinal) to compress into a sequence. Sequential spaces are those topological spaces for which nets of countable length (i.e., sequences) suffice to describe the topology.

Any topology can be refined (that is, made finer) to a sequential topology, called the sequential coreflection of $X.$

The related concepts of Fréchet–Urysohn spaces, T-sequential spaces, and $N$-sequential spaces are also defined in terms of how a space's topology interacts with sequences, but have subtly different properties.

Sequential spaces and $N$-sequential spaces were introduced by S. P. Franklin.

== History ==
Although spaces satisfying such properties had implicitly been studied for several years, the first formal definition is due to S. P. Franklin in 1965. Franklin wanted to determine "the classes of topological spaces that can be specified completely by the knowledge of their convergent sequences", and began by investigating the first-countable spaces, for which it was already known that sequences sufficed. Franklin then arrived at the modern definition by abstracting the necessary properties of first-countable spaces.

== Preliminary definitions ==
Let $X$ be a set and let $x_{\bull} = \left(x_i\right)_{i=1}^{\infty}$ be a sequence in $X$; that is, a family of elements of $X$, indexed by the natural numbers. In this article, $x_{\bull} \subseteq S$ means that each element in the sequence $x_{\bull}$ is an element of $S,$ and, if $f : X \to Y$ is a map, then $f\left(x_{\bull}\right) = \left(f\left(x_i\right)\right)_{i=1}^{\infty}.$ For any index $i,$ the tail of $x_{\bull}$ starting at $i$ is the sequence
$$x_{\geq i} = (x_i, x_{i+1}, x_{i+2}, \ldots)\text{.}$$
A sequence $x_{\bull}$ is eventually in $S$ if some tail of $x_{\bull}$ satisfies $x_{\geq i} \subseteq S.$

Let $\tau$ be a topology on $X$ and $x_{\bull}$ a sequence therein. The sequence $x_{\bull}$ converges to a point $x \in X,$ written $x_{\bull}\overset{\tau}{\to} x$ (when context allows, $x_\bull\to x$), if, for every neighborhood $U\in\tau$ of $x,$ eventually $x_{\bull}$ is in $U.$ $x$ is then called a limit point of $x_{\bull}.$

A function $f : X \to Y$ between topological spaces is sequentially continuous if $x_\bull\to x$ implies $f(x_\bull)\to f(x).$

== Sequential closure/interior ==
Let $(X, \tau)$ be a topological space and let $S \subseteq X$ be a subset. The topological closure (resp. topological interior) of $S$ in $(X, \tau)$ is denoted by $\operatorname{cl}_X S$ (resp. $\operatorname{int}_X S$).

The sequential closure of $S$ in $(X, \tau)$ is the set
$$\operatorname{scl}(S) = \left\{x \in X: \text{there exists a sequence }s_{\bull} \subseteq S\text{ such that }s_{\bull} \to x \right\}$$
which defines a map, the sequential closure operator, on the power set of $X.$ If necessary for clarity, this set may also be written $\operatorname{scl}_{X}(S)$ or $\operatorname{scl}_{(X,\tau)}(S).$ It is always the case that $\operatorname{scl}_X S \subseteq \operatorname{cl}_X S,$ but the reverse may fail.

The sequential interior of $S$ in $(X, \tau)$ is the set
$$\operatorname{sint}(S) = \{s \in S: \text{whenever }x_{\bull}\subseteq X\text{ and }x_{\bull}\to s,\text{ then }x_{\bull}\text{ is eventually in }S\}$$
(the topological space again indicated with a subscript if necessary).

Sequential closure and interior satisfy many of the nice properties of topological closure and interior: for all subsets $R, S \subseteq X,$

- $\operatorname{scl}_X(X\setminus S)=X\setminus\operatorname{sint}_X(S)$ and $\operatorname{sint}_X(X\setminus S)=X\setminus\operatorname{scl}_X(S)$;
  Proof
  Fix $x\in\operatorname{sint}(X\setminus S).$ If $x\in\operatorname{scl}(S),$ then there exists $s_\bull\subseteq S$ with $s_\bull\to x.$ But by the definition of sequential interior, eventually $s_\bull$ is in $X\setminus S,$ contradicting $s_\bull\subseteq S.$
  Conversely, suppose $x\notin\operatorname{sint}(X\setminus S)$; then there exists a sequence $s_\bull\subseteq X$ with $s_\bull\to x$ that is not eventually in $X\setminus S.$ By passing to the subsequence of elements not in $X\setminus S,$ we may assume that $s_\bull\subseteq S.$ But then $x\in\operatorname{scl}(S).$
  ▮
- $\operatorname{scl}(\emptyset) = \emptyset$ and $\operatorname{sint}(\emptyset)=\emptyset$;
- $\operatorname{sint}(S)\subseteq S\subseteq\operatorname{scl}(S)$;
- $\operatorname{scl}(R\cup S)=\operatorname{scl}(R)\cup\operatorname{scl}(S)$; and
- $\operatorname{scl}(S)\subseteq\operatorname{scl}(\operatorname{scl}(S)).$

That is, sequential closure is a preclosure operator. Unlike topological closure, sequential closure is not idempotent: the last containment may be strict. Thus sequential closure is not a (Kuratowski) closure operator.

=== Sequentially closed and open sets ===
A set $S$ is sequentially closed if $S=\operatorname{scl}(S)$; equivalently, for all $s_{\bull}\subseteq S$ and $x \in X$ such that $s_{\bull}\overset{\tau}{\to}x,$ we must have $x\in S.$ (Note: You cannot simultaneously apply this "test" to infinitely many subsets (for example, you can not use something akin to the axiom of choice). Not all sequential spaces are Fréchet-Urysohn, but only in those spaces can the closure of a set $S$ can be determined without it ever being necessary to consider any set other than $S.$)

A set $S$ is defined to be sequentially open if its complement is sequentially closed. Equivalent conditions include:

- $S = \operatorname{sint}(S)$ or
- For all $x_{\bull}\subseteq X$ and $s \in S$ such that $x_{\bull}\overset{\tau}{\to}s,$ eventually $x_{\bull}$ is in $S$ (that is, there exists some integer $i$ such that the tail $x_{\geq i} \subseteq S$).

A set $S$ is a sequential neighborhood of a point $x \in X$ if it contains $x$ in its sequential interior; sequential neighborhoods need not be sequentially open (see § T- and N-sequential spaces below).

It is possible for a subset of $X$ to be sequentially open but not open. Similarly, it is possible for there to exist a sequentially closed subset that is not closed.

== Sequential spaces and coreflection ==
As discussed above, sequential closure is not in general idempotent, and so not the closure operator of a topology. One can obtain an idempotent sequential closure via transfinite iteration: for a successor ordinal $\alpha+1,$ define (as usual)
$$(\operatorname{scl})^{\alpha+1}(S)=\operatorname{scl}((\operatorname{scl})^\alpha(S))$$
and, for a limit ordinal $\alpha,$ define
$$(\operatorname{scl})^\alpha(S)=\bigcup_{\beta<\alpha}{(\operatorname{scl})^\beta(S)}\text{.}$$
This process gives an ordinal-indexed increasing sequence of sets; as it turns out, that sequence always stabilizes by index $\omega_1$ (the first uncountable ordinal). Conversely, the sequential order of $X$ is the minimal ordinal at which, for any choice of $S,$ the above sequence will stabilize.

The transfinite sequential closure of $S$ is the terminal set in the above sequence: $(\operatorname{scl})^{\omega_1}(S).$ The operator $(\operatorname{scl})^{\omega_1}$ is idempotent and thus a closure operator. In particular, it defines a topology, the sequential coreflection. In the sequential coreflection, every sequentially-closed set is closed (and every sequentially-open set is open).

=== Sequential spaces ===
A topological space $(X, \tau)$ is sequential if it satisfies any of the following equivalent conditions:

- $\tau$ is its own sequential coreflection.
- Every sequentially open subset of $X$ is open.
- Every sequentially closed subset of $X$ is closed.
- For any subset $S \subseteq X$ that is not closed in $X,$ there exists some (Note: A Fréchet–Urysohn space is defined by the analogous condition for all (not "some") such $x$: For any subset $S \subseteq X$ that is not closed in $X,$ for any $x \in \operatorname{cl}_X(S) \setminus S,$ there exists a sequence in $S$ that converges to $x.$) $x\in\operatorname{cl}(S)\setminus S$ and a sequence in $S$ that converges to $x.$
- (Universal Property) For every topological space $Y,$ a map $f : X \to Y$ is continuous if and only if it is sequentially continuous (if $x_{\bull} \to x$ then $f\left(x_{\bull}\right) \to f(x)$).
- $X$ is the quotient of a first-countable space.
- $X$ is the quotient of a metric space.

By taking $Y = X$ and $f$ to be the identity map on $X$ in the universal property, it follows that the class of sequential spaces consists precisely of those spaces whose topological structure is determined by convergent sequences. If two topologies agree on convergent sequences, then they necessarily have the same sequential coreflection. Moreover, a function from $Y$ is sequentially continuous if and only if it is continuous on the sequential coreflection (that is, when pre-composed with $f$).

== T- and N-sequential spaces ==
A T-sequential space is a topological space with sequential order 1, which is equivalent to any of the following conditions:

- The sequential closure (or interior) of every subset of $X$ is sequentially closed (resp. open).
- $\operatorname{scl}$ or $\operatorname{sint}$ are idempotent.
- $\operatorname{scl}(S)=\bigcap_{\text{sequentially closed }C\supseteq S}{C}$ or $\operatorname{sint}(S)=\bigcup_{\text{sequentially open }U\subseteq S}{U}$
- Any sequential neighborhood of $x \in X$ can be shrunk to a sequentially-open set that contains $x$; formally, sequentially-open neighborhoods are a neighborhood basis for the sequential neighborhoods.
- For any $x \in X$ and any sequential neighborhood $N$ of $x,$ there exists a sequential neighborhood $M$ of $x$ such that, for every $m \in M,$ the set $N$ is a sequential neighborhood of $m.$

Being a T-sequential space is incomparable with being a sequential space; there are sequential spaces that are not T-sequential and vice-versa. However, a topological space $(X, \tau)$ is called a $N$-sequential (or neighborhood-sequential) if it is both sequential and T-sequential. An equivalent condition is that every sequential neighborhood contains an open (classical) neighborhood.

Every first-countable space (and thus every metrizable space) is $N$-sequential. There exist topological vector spaces that are sequential but not $N$-sequential (and thus not T-sequential).

=== Fréchet–Urysohn spaces ===
A topological space $(X, \tau)$ is called Fréchet–Urysohn if it satisfies any of the following equivalent conditions:

- $X$ is hereditarily sequential; that is, every topological subspace is sequential.
- For every subset $S \subseteq X,$ $\operatorname{scl}_X S = \operatorname{cl}_X S.$
- For any subset $S \subseteq X$ that is not closed in $X$ and every $x \in \left(\operatorname{cl}_X S\right) \setminus S,$ there exists a sequence in $S$ that converges to $x.$

Fréchet–Urysohn spaces are also sometimes said to be "Fréchet," but should be confused with neither Fréchet spaces in functional analysis nor the T_{1} condition.

== Examples and sufficient conditions ==
Every CW-complex is sequential, as it can be considered as a quotient of a metric space.

The prime spectrum of a commutative Noetherian ring with the Zariski topology is sequential.

Take the real line $\R$ and identify the set $\Z$ of integers to a point. As a quotient of a metric space, the result is sequential, but it is not first countable.

Every first-countable space is Fréchet–Urysohn and every Fréchet-Urysohn space is sequential. Thus every metrizable or pseudometrizable space — in particular, every second-countable space, metric space, or discrete space — is sequential.

Let $\mathcal{F}$ be a set of maps from Fréchet–Urysohn spaces to $X.$ Then the final topology that $\mathcal{F}$ induces on $X$ is sequential.

A Hausdorff topological vector space is sequential if and only if there exists no strictly finer topology with the same convergent sequences.

=== Spaces that are sequential but not Fréchet-Urysohn ===
Schwartz space $\mathcal{S}\left(\R^n\right)$and the space $C^{\infty}(U)$ of smooth functions, as discussed in the article on distributions, are both widely-used sequential spaces.

More generally, every infinite-dimensional Montel DF-space is sequential but not Fréchet–Urysohn.

Arens' space is sequential, but not Fréchet–Urysohn.

=== Non-examples (spaces that are not sequential) ===
The simplest space that is not sequential is the cocountable topology on an uncountable set. Every convergent sequence in such a space is eventually constant; hence every set is sequentially open. But the cocountable topology is not discrete. (One could call the topology "sequentially discrete".)

Let $C_c^k(U)$ denote the space of $k$-smooth test functions with its canonical topology and let $\mathcal{D}'(U)$ denote the space of distributions, the strong dual space of $C_c^{\infty}(U)$; neither are sequential (nor even an Ascoli space). On the other hand, both $C_c^{\infty}(U)$ and $\mathcal{D}'(U)$ are Montel spaces and, in the dual space of any Montel space, a sequence of continuous linear functionals converges in the strong dual topology if and only if it converges in the weak* topology (that is, converges pointwise).

== Consequences ==
Every sequential space has countable tightness and is compactly generated.

If $f : X \to Y$ is a continuous open surjection between two Hausdorff sequential spaces then the set $\{y:{|f^{-1}(y)| = 1}\}\subseteq Y$ of points with unique preimage is closed. (By continuity, so is its preimage in $X,$ the set of all points on which $f$ is injective.)

If $f : X \to Y$ is a surjective map (not necessarily continuous) onto a Hausdorff sequential space $Y$ and $\mathcal{B}$ bases for the topology on $X,$ then $f : X \to Y$ is an open map if and only if, for every $x \in X,$ basic neighborhood $B \in \mathcal{B}$ of $x,$ and sequence $y_{\bull} = \left(y_i\right)_{i=1}^{\infty} \to f(x)$ in $Y,$ there is a subsequence of $y_\bull$ that is eventually in $f(B).$

== Categorical properties ==
The full subcategory Seq of all sequential spaces is closed under the following operations in the category Top of topological spaces:

- Quotients
- Continuous closed or open images
- Sums
- Inductive limits
- Open and closed subspaces

The category Seq is not closed under the following operations in Top:

- Continuous images
- Subspaces
- Finite products

Since they are closed under topological sums and quotients, the sequential spaces form a coreflective subcategory of the category of topological spaces. In fact, they are the coreflective hull of metrizable spaces (that is, the smallest class of topological spaces closed under sums and quotients and containing the metrizable spaces).

The subcategory Seq is a Cartesian closed category with respect to its own product (not that of Top). The exponential objects are equipped with the (convergent sequence)-open topology.

P.I. Booth and A. Tillotson have shown that Seq is the smallest Cartesian closed subcategory of Top containing the underlying topological spaces of all metric spaces, CW-complexes, and differentiable manifolds and that is closed under colimits, quotients, and other "certain reasonable identities" that Norman Steenrod described as "convenient".

Every sequential space is compactly generated, and finite products in Seq coincide with those for compactly generated spaces, since products in the category of compactly generated spaces preserve quotients of metric spaces.

== See also ==
- Axiom of countability
- Closed graph property – Property of functions in topology
- First-countable space – Topological space where each point has a countable neighbourhood basis
- Fréchet–Urysohn space – Type of topological space
- Sequence covering map
