= First-countable space =

Topological space where each point has a countable neighbourhood basis

In topology, a branch of mathematics, a first-countable space is a topological space satisfying the "first axiom of countability". Specifically, a space $X$ is said to be first-countable if each point has a countable neighbourhood basis (local base). That is, for each point $x$ in $X$ there exists a sequence $N_1, N_2, \ldots$ of neighbourhoods of $x$ such that for any neighbourhood $N$ of $x$ there exists an integer $i$ with $N_i$ contained in $N.$ Since every neighborhood of any point contains an open neighborhood of that point, the neighbourhood basis can be chosen without loss of generality to consist of open neighborhoods.

== Examples and counterexamples ==
The majority of 'everyday' spaces in mathematics are first-countable. In particular, every metric space is first-countable. To see this, note that the set of open balls centered at $x$ with radius $2^{-n}$ for all natural numbers $n$ form a countable local base at $x$.

An example of a space that is not first-countable is the cofinite topology on an uncountable set (such as the real line). More generally, the Zariski topology on an algebraic variety over an uncountable field is not first-countable.

Another counterexample is the ordinal space $\omega_1 + 1 = \left[0, \omega_1\right]$ where $\omega_1$ is the first uncountable ordinal number. The element $\omega_1$ is a limit point of the subset $\left[0, \omega_1\right)$ even though no sequence of elements in $\left[0, \omega_1\right)$ has the element $\omega_1$ as its limit. In particular, the point $\omega_1$ in the space $\omega_1 + 1 = \left[0, \omega_1\right]$ does not have a countable local base. Since $\omega_1$ is the only such point, however, the subspace $\omega_1 = \left[0, \omega_1\right)$ is first-countable.

The quotient space $\R / \N$ where the natural numbers on the real line are identified as a single point is not first countable. However, this space has the property that for any subset $A$ and every element $x$ in the closure of $A,$ there is a sequence in $A$ converging to $x.$ A space with this sequence property is sometimes called a Fréchet–Urysohn space.

First-countability is strictly weaker than second-countability. Every second-countable space is first-countable, but any uncountable discrete space is first-countable but not second-countable.

== Properties ==
One of the most important properties of first-countable spaces is that given a subset $A,$ a point $x$ lies in the closure of $A$ if and only if there exists a sequence $\left(x_n\right)_{n=1}^{\infty}$ in $A$ that converges to $x.$ (In other words, every first-countable space is a Fréchet-Urysohn space and thus also a sequential space.) This has consequences for limits and continuity. In particular, if $f$ is a function on a first-countable space, then $f$ has a limit $L$ at the point $x$ if and only if for every sequence $x_n \to x,$ where $x_n \neq x$ for all $n,$ we have $f\left(x_n\right) \to L.$ Also, if $f$ is a function on a first-countable space, then $f$ is continuous if and only if whenever $x_n \to x,$ then $f\left(x_n\right) \to f(x).$

In first-countable spaces, sequential compactness and countable compactness are equivalent properties. However, there exist examples of sequentially compact, first-countable spaces that are not compact (these are necessarily not metrizable spaces). One such space is the ordinal space $\left[0, \omega_1\right).$ Every first-countable space is compactly generated.

Every subspace of a first-countable space is first-countable. Any countable product of a first-countable space is first-countable, although uncountable products need not be.

== See also ==
- Fréchet–Urysohn space – Type of topological space
- Second-countable space – Topological space whose topology has a countable base
- Separable space – Topological space with a dense countable subset
- Sequential space – Topological space characterized by sequences

== Bibliography ==
- "first axiom of countability", Encyclopedia of Mathematics, EMS Press, 2001 [1994]
- Engelking, Ryszard (1989). General Topology. Sigma Series in Pure Mathematics, Vol. 6 (Revised and completed ed.). Heldermann Verlag, Berlin. ISBN 3885380064.
