= Hausdorff space =

Type of topological space

Separation axioms in topological spaces

Kolmogorov classification
- T_{0}: Kolmogorov
- T_{1}: Fréchet
- T_{2}: Hausdorff
- T_{2½}: Urysohn
- completely T_{2}: completely Hausdorff
- T_{3}: regular Hausdorff
- T_{3½}: Tychonoff
- T_{4}: normal Hausdorff
- T_{5}: completely normal Hausdorff
- T_{6}: perfectly normal Hausdorff

In topology and related branches of mathematics, a Hausdorff space (/ˈhaʊsdɔːrf/ HOWSS-dorf, /ˈhaʊzdɔːrf/ HOWZ-dorf), T_{2} space or separated space, is a topological space where distinct points have disjoint neighbourhoods. Of the many separation axioms that can be imposed on a topological space, the "Hausdorff condition" (T_{2}) is the most frequently used and discussed. It implies the uniqueness of limits of sequences, nets, and filters.

Hausdorff spaces are named after Felix Hausdorff, one of the founders of topology. Hausdorff's original definition of a topological space (in 1914) included the Hausdorff condition as an axiom.

== Definitions ==
The points x and y, separated by their respective neighbourhoods U and V.

Points $x$ and $y$ in a topological space $X$ can be separated by neighbourhoods if there exists a neighbourhood $U$ of $x$ and a neighbourhood $V$ of $y$ such that $U$ and $V$ are disjoint $(U\cap V=\varnothing)$. $X$ is a Hausdorff space if any two distinct points in $X$ are separated by neighbourhoods. This condition is the third separation axiom (after T_{0} and T_{1}), which is why Hausdorff spaces are also called T_{2} spaces. The name separated space is also used.

A related, but weaker, notion is that of a preregular space. $X$ is a preregular space if any two topologically distinguishable points can be separated by disjoint neighbourhoods. A preregular space is also called an R_{1} space.

The relationship between these two conditions is as follows. A topological space is Hausdorff if and only if it is both preregular (i.e. topologically distinguishable points are separated by neighbourhoods) and Kolmogorov (i.e. distinct points are topologically distinguishable). A topological space is preregular if and only if its Kolmogorov quotient is Hausdorff.

== Equivalences ==
For a topological space $X$, the following are equivalent:

- $X$ is a Hausdorff space.
- Limits of nets in $X$ are unique.
- Limits of filters on $X$ are unique.
- Any singleton set $\{ x \} \subset X$ is equal to the intersection of all closed neighbourhoods of $x$. (A closed neighbourhood of $x$ is a closed set that contains an open set containing $x$.)
- The diagonal $\Delta = \{ (x, x) \mid x \in X \}$ is closed as a subset of the product space $X \times X$.
- Any injection from the discrete space with two points to $X$ has the left lifting property with respect to the map from the finite topological space with two open points and one closed point to a single point.

== Examples of Hausdorff and non-Hausdorff spaces ==
Almost all spaces encountered in analysis are Hausdorff; most importantly, the real numbers (under the standard metric topology on real numbers) are a Hausdorff space. More generally, all metric spaces are Hausdorff. In fact, many spaces of use in analysis, such as topological groups and topological manifolds, have the Hausdorff condition explicitly stated in their definitions.

A simple example of a topology that is T_{1} but is not Hausdorff is the cofinite topology defined on an infinite set, as is the cocountable topology defined on an uncountable set.

Pseudometric spaces typically are not Hausdorff, but they are preregular, and their use in analysis is usually only in the construction of Hausdorff gauge spaces. Indeed, when analysts run across a non-Hausdorff space, it is still probably at least preregular, and then they simply replace it with its Kolmogorov quotient, which is Hausdorff.

In contrast, non-preregular spaces are encountered much more frequently in abstract algebra and algebraic geometry, in particular as the Zariski topology on an algebraic variety or the spectrum of a ring. They also arise in the model theory of intuitionistic logic: every complete Heyting algebra is the algebra of open sets of some topological space, but this space need not be preregular, much less Hausdorff, and in fact usually is neither. The related concept of Scott domain also consists of non-preregular spaces.

While the existence of unique limits for convergent nets and filters implies that a space is Hausdorff, there are non-Hausdorff T_{1} spaces in which every convergent sequence has a unique limit. Such spaces are called US spaces. For sequential spaces, this notion is equivalent to being weakly Hausdorff.

== Properties ==
Subspaces and products of Hausdorff spaces are Hausdorff, but quotient spaces of Hausdorff spaces need not be Hausdorff. In fact, every topological space can be realized as the quotient of some Hausdorff space.

Hausdorff spaces are T_{1}, meaning that each singleton is a closed set. Similarly, preregular spaces are R_{0}. Every Hausdorff space is a Sober space although the converse is in general not true.

Another property of Hausdorff spaces is that each compact set is a closed set. For non-Hausdorff spaces, it can be that each compact set is a closed set (for example, the cocountable topology on an uncountable set) or not (for example, the cofinite topology on an infinite set and the Sierpiński space).

The definition of a Hausdorff space says that points can be separated by neighborhoods. It turns out that this implies something which is seemingly stronger: in a Hausdorff space every pair of disjoint compact sets can also be separated by neighborhoods, in other words there is a neighborhood of one set and a neighborhood of the other, such that the two neighborhoods are disjoint. This is an example of the general rule that compact sets often behave like points.

Compactness conditions together with preregularity often imply stronger separation axioms. For example, any locally compact preregular space is completely regular. Compact preregular spaces are normal, meaning that they satisfy Urysohn's lemma and the Tietze extension theorem and have partitions of unity subordinate to locally finite open covers. The Hausdorff versions of these statements are: every locally compact Hausdorff space is Tychonoff, and every compact Hausdorff space is normal Hausdorff.

The following results are some technical properties regarding maps (continuous and otherwise) to and from Hausdorff spaces.

Let $f\colon X \to Y$ be a continuous function and suppose $Y$ is Hausdorff. Then the graph of $f$, $\{(x,f(x)) \mid x\in X\}$, is a closed subset of $X \times Y$.

Let $f\colon X \to Y$ be a function and let $\ker(f) \triangleq \{(x,x') \mid f(x) = f(x')\}$ be its kernel regarded as a subspace of $X \times X$.

- If $f$ is continuous and $Y$ is Hausdorff then $\ker(f)$ is a closed set.
- If $f$ is an open surjection and $\ker(f)$ is a closed set then $Y$ is Hausdorff.
- If $f$ is a continuous, open surjection (i.e. an open quotient map) then $Y$ is Hausdorff if and only if $\ker(f)$ is a closed set.

If $f, g \colon X \to Y$ are continuous maps and $Y$ is Hausdorff then the equalizer $\mbox{eq}(f,g) = \{x \mid f(x) = g(x)\}$ is a closed set in $X$. It follows that if $Y$ is Hausdorff and $f$ and $g$ agree on a dense subset of $X$ then $f = g$. In other words, continuous functions into Hausdorff spaces are determined by their values on dense subsets.

Let $f\colon X \to Y$ be a closed surjection such that $f^{-1} (y)$ is compact for all $y \in Y$. Then if $X$ is Hausdorff so is $Y$.

Let $f\colon X \to Y$ be a quotient map with $X$ a compact Hausdorff space. Then the following are equivalent:

- $Y$ is Hausdorff.
- $f$ is a closed map.
- $\ker(f)$ is a closed set.

== Preregularity versus regularity ==
All regular spaces are preregular, as are all Hausdorff spaces. There are many results for topological spaces that hold for both regular and Hausdorff spaces. Most of the time, these results hold for all preregular spaces; they were listed for regular and Hausdorff spaces separately because the idea of preregular spaces came later. On the other hand, those results that are truly about regularity generally do not also apply to nonregular Hausdorff spaces.

There are many situations where another condition of topological spaces (such as paracompactness or local compactness) will imply regularity if preregularity is satisfied. Such conditions often come in two versions: a regular version and a Hausdorff version. Although Hausdorff spaces are not, in general, regular, a Hausdorff space that is also (say) locally compact will be regular, because any Hausdorff space is preregular. Thus from a certain point of view, it is really preregularity, rather than regularity, that matters in these situations. However, definitions are usually still phrased in terms of regularity, since this condition is better known than preregularity.

See History of the separation axioms for more on this issue.

== Variants ==
The terms "Hausdorff", "separated", and "preregular" can also be applied to such variants on topological spaces as uniform spaces, Cauchy spaces, and convergence spaces. The characteristic that unites the concept in all of these examples is that limits of nets and filters (when they exist) are unique (for separated spaces) or unique up to topological indistinguishability (for preregular spaces).

As it turns out, uniform spaces, and more generally Cauchy spaces, are always preregular, so the Hausdorff condition in these cases reduces to the T_{0} condition. These are also the spaces in which completeness makes sense, and Hausdorffness is a natural companion to completeness in these cases. Specifically, a space is complete if and only if every Cauchy net has at least one limit, while a space is Hausdorff if and only if every Cauchy net has at most one limit (since only Cauchy nets can have limits in the first place).

== Algebra of functions ==
The algebra of continuous (real or complex) functions on a compact Hausdorff space is a commutative C*-algebra, and conversely by the Banach–Stone theorem one can recover the topology of the space from the algebraic properties of its algebra of continuous functions. This leads to noncommutative geometry, where one considers noncommutative C*-algebras as representing algebras of functions on a noncommutative space.

== Academic humour ==
- Hausdorff condition is illustrated by the pun that in Hausdorff spaces any two points can be "housed off" from each other by open sets.
- In the Mathematics Institute of the University of Bonn, in which Felix Hausdorff researched and lectured, there is a certain room designated the Hausdorff-Raum. This is a pun, as Raum means both room and space in German.

== See also ==
- Fixed-point space – Space where all functions have fixed points, a Hausdorff space X such that every continuous function f : X → X has a fixed point.
- Locally Hausdorff space – Space such that every point has a Hausdorff neighborhood
- Non-Hausdorff manifold – Generalization of manifolds
- Quasitopological space – Function in topology
- Separation axiom – Axioms in topology defining notions of "separation"
- Weak Hausdorff space
