= James Dugundji =

American mathematician

- Born: August 30, 1919; New York City, New York
- Died: January 8, 1985 (aged 65); Los Angeles, California
- Education: Massachusetts Institute of Technology; New York University
- Scientific career
- Fields: Mathematics
- Workplaces: University of Southern California
- Thesis: The fundamental group for spaces which are not LC¹ (1948)
- Doctoral advisor: Witold Hurewicz
- Doctoral students: Jacqueline Dewar

James Dugundji (August 30, 1919 – January 8, 1985) was an American mathematician, a professor of mathematics at the University of Southern California.

== Life ==
Dugundji's parents emigrated from Greece to New York City, where Dugundji was born in 1919. He studied at New York University, graduating with a B.A. in 1940, and went on to graduate school at the University of North Carolina at Chapel Hill, studying there under the supervision of Witold Hurewicz. After two years of study at UNC, Dugundji joined the United States Air Force for the duration of World War II, and then completed his doctorate from 1946 to 1948 at the Massachusetts Institute of Technology, to which his advisor had moved. He then took a faculty position at the University of Southern California, where he remained for the rest of his career. He was also a long-time member of the editorial boards of two mathematics journals, the Pacific Journal of Mathematics and Topology and its Applications.

Dugundji is the author of the textbook Topology (Allyn and Bacon, 1966), on general topology. Reviewer M. Edelstein wrote that this was "one of the best among the numerous books on the subject", and it went through numerous reprintings. With Andrzej Granas he also wrote the research monograph Fixed Point Theory; originally planned as a two-volume series, the first volume was published by Państwowe Wydawnictwo Naukowe in 1982, and the complete text was published as a single volume in 2003 by Springer-Verlag. Reviewer A. G. Kartsatos called the completed volume "the most comprehensive, well-written and complete book on fixed point theory to date".

In his own research, as well as producing highly cited works on problems of pure mathematics such as the Tietze extension theorem, Dugundji did important early work in cheminformatics. With co-authors I. Ugi, R. Kopp and D. Marquarding, he wrote a book on this subject as well, Perspectives in Theoretical Stereochemistry (Springer, 1984).

In 2005, an international conference on fixed point theorems was held in Dugundji's memory in Będlewo, Poland.

== Selected publications ==
- Dugundji, J. (1950). "A topologized fundamental group". Proc Natl Acad Sci U S A. 36 (2): 141–143. Bibcode:1950PNAS...36..141D. doi:10.1073/pnas.36.2.141. PMC 1063149. PMID 16588960.
- Dugundji, James (1966). Topology. Boston: Allyn and Bacon. ISBN 978-0-697-06889-7. OCLC 395340485.
- Dugundji, James; Michael, Ernest (1956). "On local and uniformly local topological properties". Proc. Amer. Math. Soc. 7 (2): 304–307. doi:10.1090/s0002-9939-1956-0077108-x. MR 0077108.
- Dugundji, J. (1957). "Continuous maps into nonsimple spaces". Trans. Amer. Math. Soc. 86 (1): 256–268. doi:10.1090/s0002-9947-1957-0090050-9. MR 0090050.
- Dugundji, J. (1957). "Products in homotopy and homology groups". Proc Natl Acad Sci U S A. 43 (11): 987–988. Bibcode:1957PNAS...43..987D. doi:10.1073/pnas.43.11.987. PMC 528569. PMID 16590127.
- Dugundji, J. (1958). "Cohomology of equivariant maps". Trans. Amer. Math. Soc. 89 (2): 408–420. doi:10.1090/s0002-9947-1958-0100837-2. MR 0100837.
- Curtis, M. L.; Dugundji, J. (1969). "Groups which are cogroups". Proc. Amer. Math. Soc. 22 (1): 235–237. doi:10.1090/s0002-9939-1969-0251722-x. MR 0251722.
- Bauer, F.-W.; Dugundji, J. (1969). "Categorical homotopy and fibrations". Trans. Amer. Math. Soc. 140: 239–256. doi:10.1090/s0002-9947-1969-0243518-4. MR 0243518.

== See also ==
- Dugundji extension theorem
