= Dugundji extension theorem =

In mathematics, the Dugundji extension theorem is a theorem in general topology due to American mathematician James Dugundji. It is directly related to the Tietze–Urysohn extension theorem — about extending continuous functions on normal spaces — of which it is, in a sense, a generalization.

== Statement ==
Let $X$ be a metrizable space, $A$ a closed subset of X, and $L$ a locally convex topological vector space. Then:

- Every continuous map $f : A \to L$ admits a continuous extension $F : X \to L$ such that the image $F(X)$ is contained in the convex hull of $f(A).$

or, equivalently:

- Every continuous map from $A$ into a convex subset $K$ of $L$ admits a continuous extension from $X$ into $K.$

== Comparison with the Tietze–Urysohn extension theorem ==
The first version of the Tietze extension theorem corresponds to the special case of the above theorem where the target space L is the real line ℝ. Urysohn generalized this to replacing the domain being a metric space by an arbitrary normal space. The Dugundji extension theorem is a transverse generalization, replacing the target ℝ by an arbitrary locally convex space. There is another generalization of the Tietze theorem assuming that the domain X is paracompact and the target L is a Banach space.

== Proof ==
Fix some metric $d$ on $X.$ Consider the open cover of $X - A$ that consists of the open balls $B(x, d(x, A)/2)$ for $x \in X - A.$ Since every metric space is paracompact, there exists a locally finite open cover $\{ U_i \}_{i \in I}$ of $X - A$ such that each $U_i$ is contained in one of those balls. Choose a partition of unity $\varphi_i$ subordinate to this cover. For each $i$, pick a point $a_i \in A$ satisfying
$$d(x_i, a_i) \le 2 d(x_i, A),$$
which is possible since for each $\epsilon > 0$, there is an $a \in A$ with $d(x, a) \le d(x, A) + \epsilon$. Define the extension $F$ on $X$ by:

$$F(x)=\begin{cases}f(x)&\text{if }x\in A,\\\sum_i \varphi_i(x)f(a_i)&\text{else.}\end{cases}$$

The map $F$ is clearly continuous on $X - A$. We shall then show it is continuous at each point $a$ in $A$ as well. For each $x$ in $U_i$, we have: $2 d(x, x_i) \le d(x_i, A)$ or
$$d(x, x_i) + 2 d(x_i, A) \le 5 d(x_i, A) - 5 d(x, x_i).$$
Thus, we have:
$$d(x, a_i) \le 5 d(x, A)$$
and then
$$d(a, a_i) \le 6 d(a, x).$$
Now, let a convex neighborhood C of $F(a)$ be given. Then, since $f$ is continuous, there is some $\delta > 0$ such that $f(B(a, \delta) \cap A) \subset C$. Then we have $F(B(a, \delta/6)) \subset C$ by the above inequality, completing the proof of the continuity. $\square$

== Notes and references ==
The article started as a machine (ChatGPT) translation of the corresponding article in French Wikipedia .

=== Original work ===
- Dugundji, J. (1951). "An extension of Tietze's theorem". Pacific Journal of Mathematics. 1: 353–367.

=== Secondary works ===
- Czesław Bessaga et Aleksander Pełczyński, Selected Topics in Infinite-Dimensional Topology, Warszawa, 1975, p. 57 et s.
- Karol Borsuk, Theory of Retracts, Warszawa, PWN, 1967, p. 77-78.

== See also ==
- Absolute extensor
