= Urysohn universal space =

In mathematics, the Urysohn universal space is a certain metric space that contains all separable metric spaces in a particularly nice manner. This concept is due to Pavel Urysohn, who presented an explicit construction. Another construction was subsequently developed by Felix Hausdorff and a more general notion was discussed by Miroslav Katětov.

== Definition ==
A metric space $(U,d)$ is called Urysohn universal if it is separable, complete, and has the following property:

given any finite metric space $X$, a point $x$ in $X$, and any isometric embedding $f:X\setminus\{x\}\to U$, there exists an isometric embedding $F:X\to U$ that extends $f$, i.e. such that $F(y)=f(y)$ for all $y$ in $X\setminus \{x\}$.

== Properties ==
If $U$ is Urysohn universal and $X$ is any separable metric space, then there exists an isometric embedding $f:X\to U$. Other spaces share this property: for instance, the space $\ell^\infty$ of all bounded real sequences with the supremum norm admits isometric embeddings of all separable metric spaces ("Fréchet embedding"), as does the space $C[0,1]$ of all continuous functions $[0,1]\to \R$, again with the supremum norm, a result due to Stefan Banach.

Furthermore, every isometry between finite subsets of $U$ extends to an isometry of $U$ onto itself. This kind of "homogeneity" actually characterizes Urysohn universal spaces: A separable complete metric space that contains an isometric image of every separable metric space is Urysohn universal if and only if it is homogeneous in this sense.

=== Existence and uniqueness ===
Urysohn proved that a Urysohn universal space exists, and that any two Urysohn universal spaces are isometric. This can be seen as follows: let $(X,d),(X',d')$ be two Urysohn universal spaces. These are separable, so fix countable dense subsets $(x_n)_n$ and $(x'_n)_n$ in $X$ and $X'$ respectively. These must be properly infinite, so by a back-and-forth argument, one can step-wise construct partial isometries $\phi_n:X\to X'$ whose domain (resp. range) contains $\{x_k:k<n\}$ (resp. $\{x'_k:k<n\}$). The union of these maps defines a partial isometry $\phi:X\to X'$ whose domain (resp. range) are dense in the respective spaces. And such maps extend (uniquely) to isometries, since a Urysohn universal space is required to be complete.

== See also ==
- Universal space
- Menger sponge § Properties (also known as the "Menger universal curve")
