= Jacqueline Dewar =

American mathematician

- Education: Saint Louis U.; U. of Southern California (PhD)
- Awards: Haimo Award (2006); AWM Fellow (2019)
- Scientific career
- Workplaces: Loyola Marymount University
- Thesis: Coincidence Theorems for Set Valued Mappings (1973)
- Doctoral advisor: James Dugundji

Jacqueline M. Dewar (née Deveny) is an American mathematician and mathematics educator known for her distinguished teaching and her mentorship of women in mathematics. She is a professor emerita of mathematics at Loyola Marymount University.

== Education and career ==
Dewar graduated summa cum laude in 1968 in mathematics from Saint Louis University College of Arts and Sciences, and earned her Ph.D. in mathematics from the University of Southern California in 1973. Her dissertation, Coincidence Theorems for Set Valued Mappings, was supervised by James Dugundji.

She was on the faculty of Loyola Marymount from 1973 until her retirement in 2013, and chaired the mathematics department there from 1983 to 1986 and again from 2005 to 2006.

== Books ==
Dewar is the co-author with Dennis G. Zill of a series of mathematics textbooks on algebra, trigonometry, precalculus, and calculus. With C. Bennett and M. Fisher, she is also the author of The scholarship of teaching and learning: A guide for scientists, engineers, and mathematicians (Oxford University Press, 2018).

== Recognition ==
In 2006, the Mathematical Association of America gave Dewar the Deborah and Franklin Haimo Award for Distinguished College or University Teaching of Mathematics. The award citation credited her for shaping several mathematics degree programs at Loyola Marymount, for her in-service work with school teachers, for her work running mathematics conferences for secondary school girls, and for "her passionate devotion to the art of teaching".

In 2018, Dewar was awarded a Service Award by the Association for Women in Mathematics. This award "recognizes individuals for helping to promote and support women in mathematics through exceptional volunteer service to the AWM." In 2019 she won the Louise Hay Award.

Dewar was selected to be part of the 2019 class of fellows of the Association for Women in Mathematics "for her work to encourage females to study and be successful in mathematics; for her commitment to educating pre-service teachers, with particular attention to gender equity; for her outreach to liberal arts students to change attitudes about mathematics and women in mathematics; and for her exemplary teaching and mentoring".

== In the media ==
Dewar appears with Jim Carrey and others in the documentary film The Number 23 Enigma (2007), explaining mathematics related to the horror film The Number 23.
