= Pavel Urysohn =

Russian mathematician

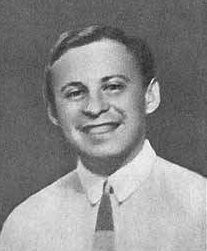
- Urysohn c. 1918-20
- Born: Pavel Samuilovich Urysohn; 3 February 1898; Odesa, Russian Empire
- Died: 17 August 1924 (aged 26); Batz-sur-Mer, Pays de la Loire, France
- Education: Moscow State University (BS, PhD)
- Years active: 1915-1924
- Known for: Urysohn's lemma; Urysohn's metrization theorem; Fréchet–Urysohn space; Menger–Urysohn dimension; Urysohn universal space; Current definition of compactness

Pavel Samuilovich Urysohn (in Russian: Па́вел Самуи́лович Урысо́н; 3 February 1898 – 17 August 1924) was a Soviet mathematician who is best known for his contributions to the theory of topological dimension, and for developing Urysohn's metrization theorem and Urysohn's lemma, both of which are fundamental results in topology. He also constructed what is now called the Urysohn universal space and his name is also commemorated in the terms Fréchet–Urysohn space, Menger–Urysohn dimension and Urysohn integral equation. He and Pavel Alexandrov formulated the modern definition of compactness in 1923.

== Biography ==
Pavel Urysohn was born in Odesa in 1898. His mother died when he was little, and he entered the care of his father and sister. The family moved to Moscow in 1912, where Urysohn completed his secondary education. While still at school, he worked at Shanyavsky University on an experimental project on X-ray radiation and was supervised by Petr Lazarev.

At that time, Urysohn's interests lay predominantly in physics. Urysohn enrolled at the Moscow State University in 1915 and earned his Bachelor of Science in 1919. There he attended the lectures of Nikolai Luzin and Dimitri Egorov, which made him turn his attention to mathematics. Between 1919 and 1921, Urysohn completed a doctorate on integral equations under the supervision of Luzin. He then became an assistant professor at Moscow University, and Egorov prompted him to start working in topology.

By 1922, Urysohn had given topological definitions to curve, surface, and dimension, and his work attracted the attention of many prominent European mathematicians. In the summers of 1923 and 1924, Urysohn and his friend and fellow mathematician, Pavel Aleksandrov, traveled through France, Holland, and Germany, where they met David Hilbert, Felix Hausdorff, and L. E. J. Brouwer. The three European mathematicians were impressed by Urysohn's work and expressed their hopes that he would visit them again in subsequent years.

Urysohn and Aleksandrov were staying in a cottage in Brittany, France, when Urysohn drowned at the age of 26 while swimming off the coast nearby Batz-sur-Mer.

Urysohn's sister, Lina Neiman, wrote a memoir about his life and childhood. Not being a mathematician, she included in the book memorial articles about his mathematical works by Pavel Alexandrov, Vadim Efremovich, Andrei Kolmogorov, Lazar Lyusternik, and Mark Krasnosel'skii.
