= Menger sponge =

Three-dimensional fractal

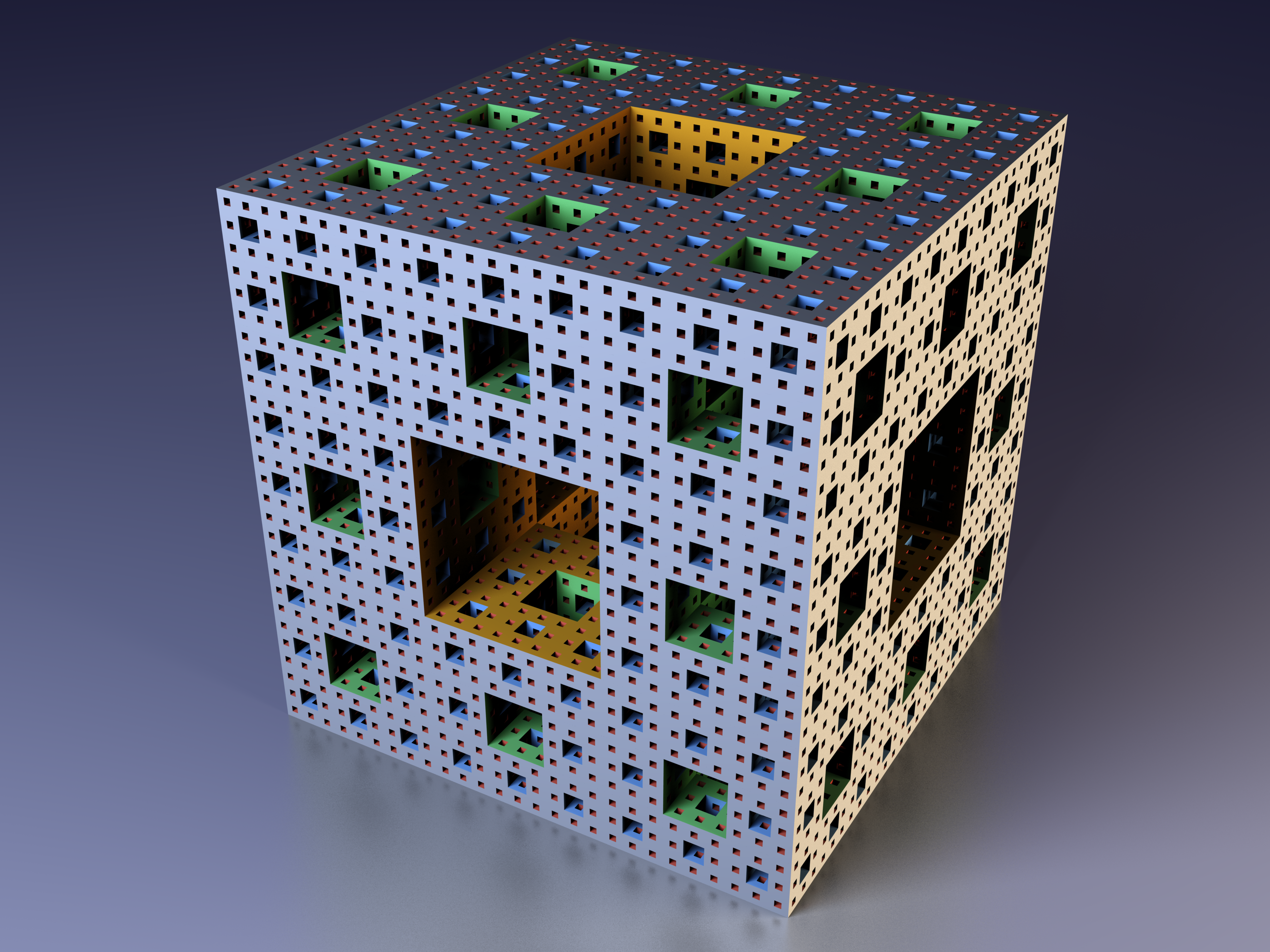
An illustration of M_{4}, the sponge after four iterations of the construction process

In mathematics, the Menger sponge (also known as the Menger cube, Menger universal curve, Sierpiński cube, or Sierpiński sponge) is a fractal curve. It is a three-dimensional generalization of the two-dimensional Sierpinski carpet. It was first described by Karl Menger in 1926, in his studies of the concept of topological dimension.

It has similar properties as the Cantor set and the Cantor dust, because the construction requires in both cases the removal of the inner third.

== Construction ==
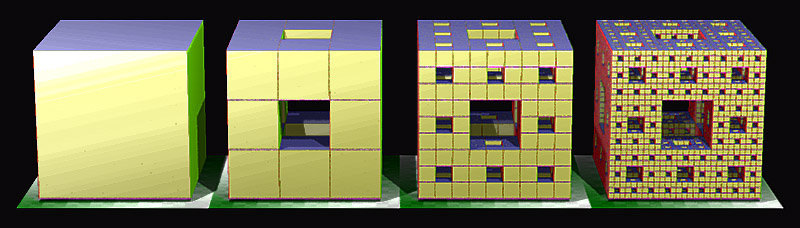
An illustration of the iterative construction of a Menger sponge up to M_{3}, the third iteration

The construction of a Menger sponge can be described as follows:

1. Begin with a cube.
2. Divide every face of the cube into nine squares in a similar manner to a Rubik's Cube. This sub-divides the cube into 27 smaller cubes.
3. Remove the smaller cube in the middle of each face and remove the smaller cube in the center of the larger cube, leaving 20 smaller cubes. This is a level 1 Menger sponge (resembling a void cube).
4. Repeat steps two and three for each of the remaining smaller cubes and continue to iterate ad infinitum.

The second iteration gives a level 2 sponge, the third iteration gives a level 3 sponge, and so on. The Menger sponge itself is the limit of this process after an infinite number of iterations.

== Properties ==
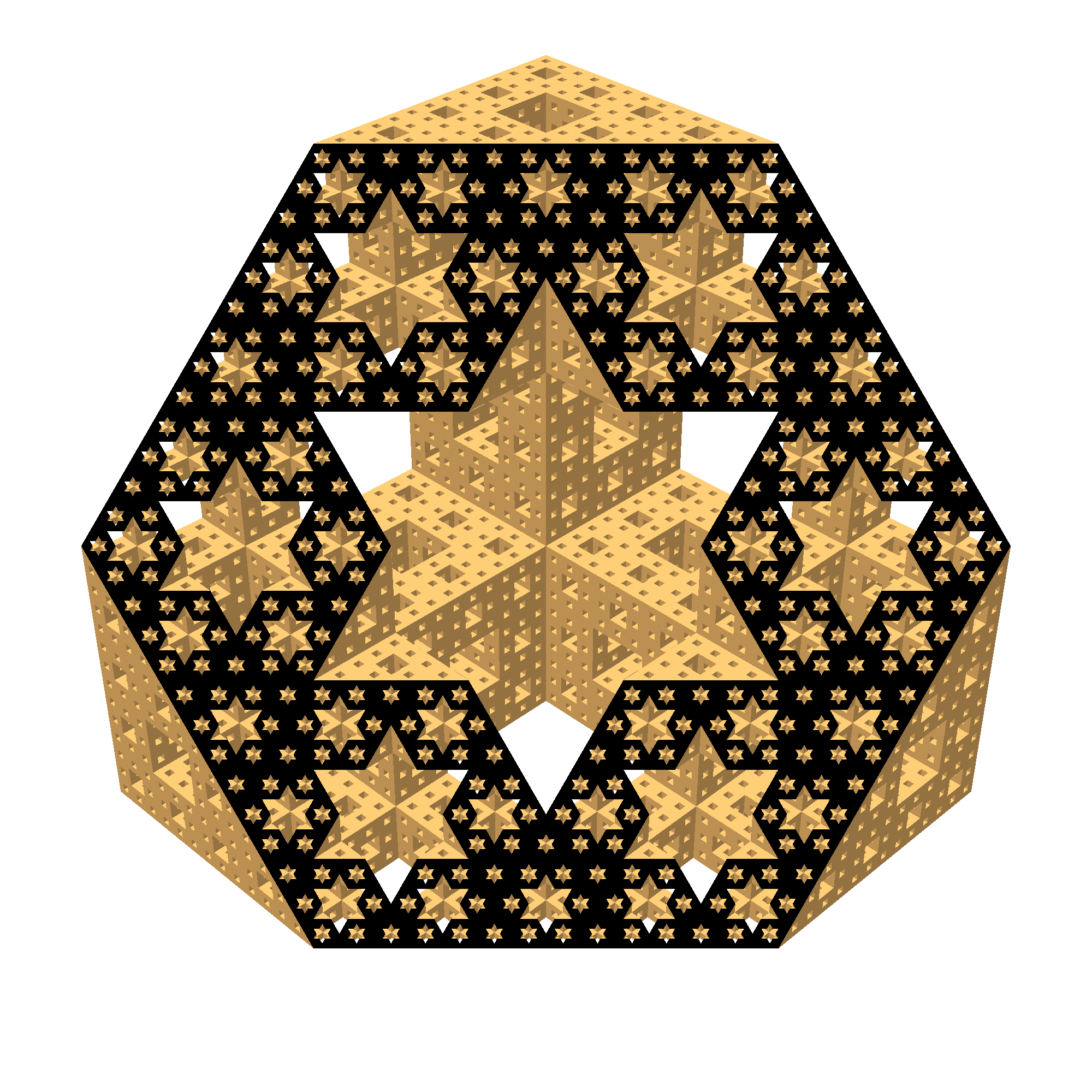
Hexagonal cross-section of a level-4 Menger sponge. (Part of a series of cuts perpendicular to the space diagonal.)

The $n$th stage of the Menger sponge, $M_n$, is made up of $20^n$ smaller cubes, each with a side length of (1/3)^{n}. The total volume of $M_n$ is thus $\left(\frac{20}{27}\right)^n$. The total surface area of $M_n$ is given by the expression $2(20/9)^n + 4(8/9)^n$. Therefore, the construction's volume approaches zero while its surface area increases without bound. Yet any chosen surface in the construction will be thoroughly punctured as the construction continues so that the limit is neither a solid nor a surface; it has a topological dimension of 1 and is accordingly identified as a curve.

Each face of the construction becomes a Sierpinski carpet, and the intersection of the sponge with any diagonal of the cube or any midline of the faces is a Cantor set. The cross-section of the sponge through its centroid and perpendicular to a space diagonal is a regular hexagon punctured with hexagrams arranged in six-fold symmetry. The number of these hexagrams, in descending size, is given by the following recurrence relation: $a_n=9a_{n-1}-12a_{n-2}$, with $a_0=1, \ a_1=6$.

The sponge's Hausdorff dimension is (log 20)/(log 3) ≅ 2.727. The Lebesgue covering dimension of the Menger sponge is one, the same as any curve. Menger showed, in the 1926 construction, that the sponge is a universal curve, in that every curve is homeomorphic to a subset of the Menger sponge, where a curve means any compact metric space of Lebesgue covering dimension one; this includes trees and graphs with an arbitrary countable number of edges, vertices and closed loops, connected in arbitrary ways. Similarly, the Sierpinski carpet is a universal curve for all curves that can be drawn on the two-dimensional plane. The Menger sponge constructed in three dimensions extends this idea to graphs that are not planar and might be embedded in any number of dimensions.

In 2024, Broden, Nazareth, and Voth proved that all knots can also be found within a Menger sponge.

The Menger sponge is a closed set; since it is also bounded, the Heine–Borel theorem implies that it is compact. It has Lebesgue measure 0. Because it contains continuous paths, it is an uncountable set.

Experiments also showed that cubes with a Menger sponge-like structure could dissipate shocks five times better for the same material than cubes without any pores.

== Formal definition ==
Formally, a Menger sponge can be defined as follows (using set intersection):

$$M := \bigcap_{n\in\mathbb{N}} M_n$$

where $M_0$ is the unit cube and

$$M_{n+1} := \left\{
(x,y,z)\in\mathbb{R}^3:
\left( \begin{array}{r}  \exists i,j,k\in\{0,1,2\} \,\, (3x-i,3y-j,3z-k)\in M_n
\\ \text{and at most one of }i,j,k\text{ is equal to 1}\end{array} \right) \right\}.$$

== MegaMenger ==
MegaMenger was a project aiming to build the largest fractal model, pioneered by Matt Parker of Queen Mary University of London and Laura Taalman of James Madison University. Each small cube is made from six interlocking folded business cards, giving a total of 960,000 for a level-four sponge. The outer surfaces are then covered with paper or cardboard panels printed with a Sierpinski carpet design to be more aesthetically pleasing. In 2014, twenty level three Menger sponges were constructed, which combined would form a distributed level four Menger sponge.

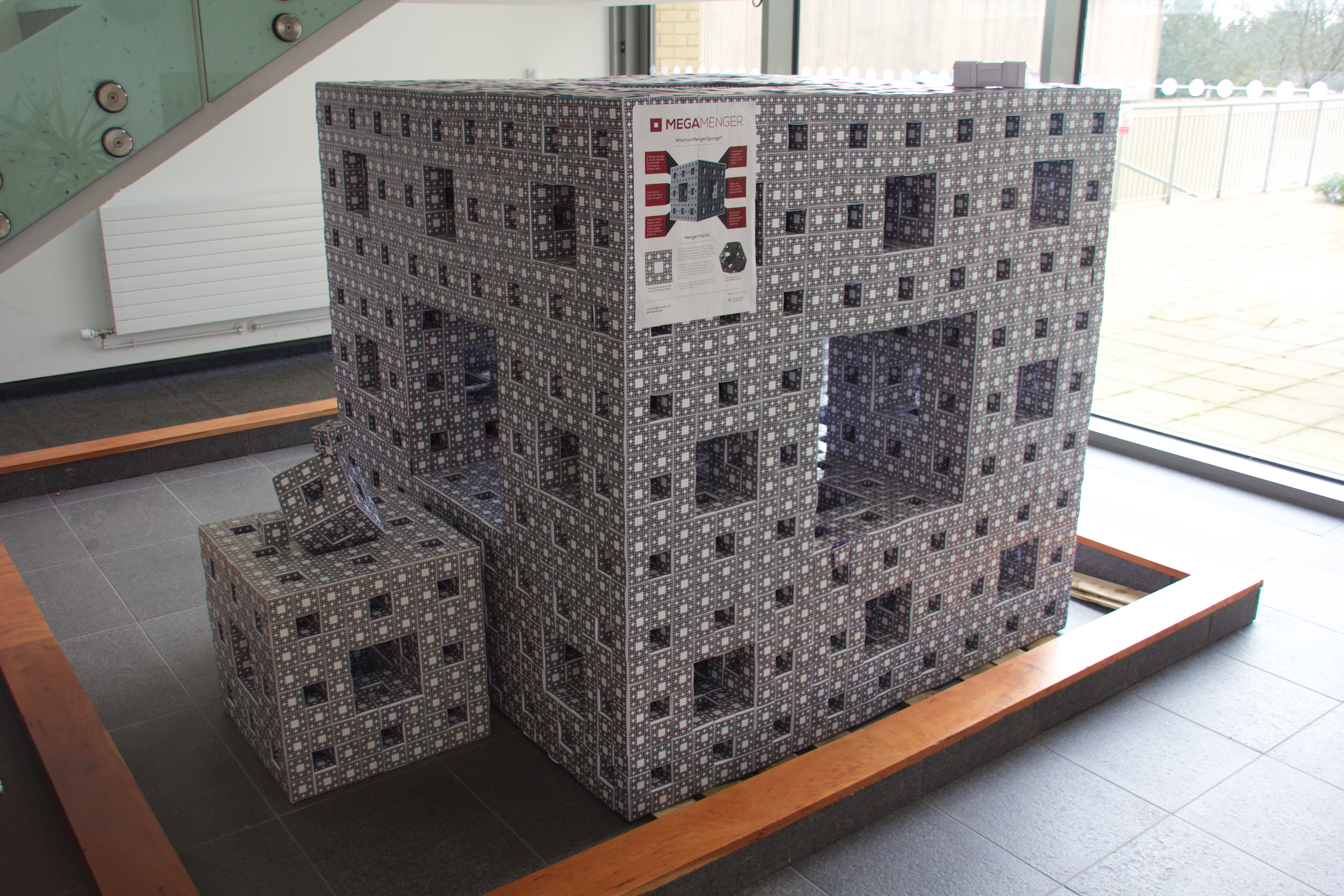
One of the MegaMengers, at the University of Bath

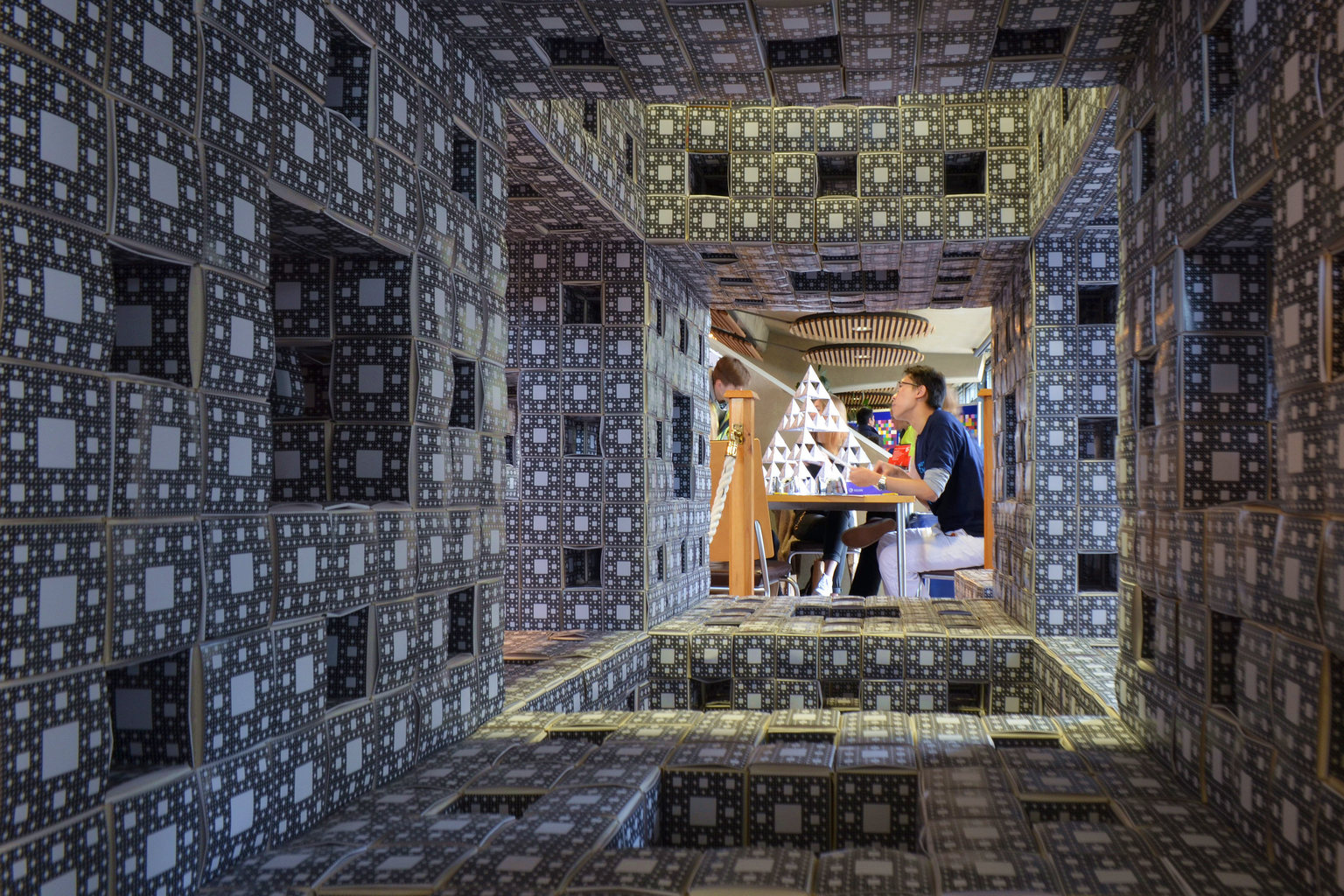
A model of a Tetrix viewed through the center of the Cambridge Level-3 MegaMenger at the 2015 Cambridge Science Festival

== Similar fractals ==
=== Jerusalem cube ===
A Jerusalem cube is a fractal object first described by Eric Baird in 2011. It is created by recursively drilling Greek cross-shaped holes into a cube. The construction is similar to the Menger sponge but with two different-sized cubes. The name comes from the face of the cube resembling a Jerusalem cross pattern.

The construction of the Jerusalem cube can be described as follows:

1. Start with a cube.
2. Cut a cross through each side of the cube, leaving eight cubes (of rank +1) at the corners of the original cube, as well as twelve smaller cubes (of rank +2) centered on the edges of the original cube between cubes of rank +1.
3. Repeat the process on the cubes of ranks 1 and 2.

Iterating an infinite number of times results in the Jerusalem cube.

Since the edge length of a cube of rank N is equal to that of 2 cubes of rank N+1 and a cube of rank N+2, it follows that the scaling factor must satisfy $k^2 + 2k = 1$, therefore $k = \sqrt{2} - 1$ which means the fractal cannot be constructed using points on a rational lattice.

Since a cube of rank N gets subdivided into 8 cubes of rank N+1 and 12 of rank N+2, the Hausdorff dimension must therefore satisfy $8k^d + 12(k^2)^d = 1$. The exact solution is

$$d=\frac{\log\left(\frac{\sqrt{7}}{6}-\frac{1}{3}\right)}{\log\left(\sqrt{2}-1\right)}$$

which is approximately 2.529

As with the Menger sponge, the faces of a Jerusalem cube are fractals with the same scaling factor. In this case, the Hausdorff dimension must satisfy $4k^d + 4(k^2)^d = 1$. The exact solution is

$$d=\frac{\log\left(\frac{\sqrt{2}-1}{2}\right)}{\log\left(\sqrt{2}-1\right)}$$

which is approximately 1.786

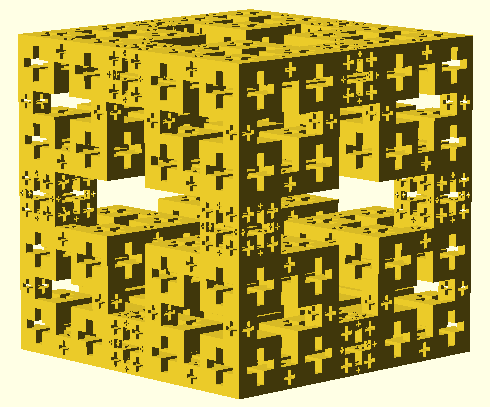
Third iteration Jerusalem cube

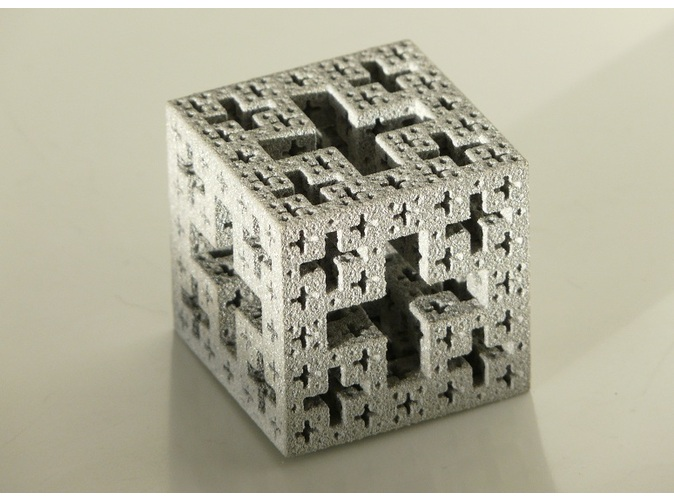
3D-printed model Jerusalem cube

=== Others ===
Sierpinski–Menger snowflake

- A Mosely snowflake is a cube-based fractal with corners recursively removed.
- A tetrix is a tetrahedron-based fractal made from four smaller copies, arranged in a tetrahedron.
- A Sierpinski–Menger snowflake is a cube-based fractal in which eight corner cubes and one central cube are kept each time at the lower and lower recursion steps. This peculiar three-dimensional fractal has the Hausdorff dimension of the natively two-dimensional object like the plane i.e. (log 9)/(log 3)=2

== See also ==
- Cantor cube
- Koch snowflake
- List of fractals by Hausdorff dimension
- Sierpiński carpet
- Sierpiński tetrahedron
- Sierpiński triangle
