= Mosely snowflake =

Sierpiński–Menger type of fractal

Mosely snowflake formation during four recursion steps

Mosely snowflake (heavier) formation during four recursion steps

In mathematics, the Mosely snowflake, named after Jeannine Mosely, is a fractal that can be obtained in two ways: either by the operation opposite to creating the Menger sponge or Cantor dust i.e. not by leaving but by removing eight of the smaller 1/3-scaled corner cubes and the central one from each cube left from the previous recursion (lighter), or, by removing only corner cubes (heavier).

In one dimension this operation (i.e. the recursive removal of two side line segments) is trivial and converges only to single point. It resembles a water snowflake. By construction, the Hausdorff dimension of the lighter snowflake is

$$d_H=\log_3 (27-9) = \ln 18 / \ln 3 \approx 2.630929$$

and the dimension of the heavier snowflake is

$$d_H=\log_3 (27-8) = \ln 19 / \ln 3 \approx 2.680143$$.

== See also ==
- Menger sponge
