= Order topology (functional analysis) =

Topology of an ordered vector space

In mathematics, specifically in order theory and functional analysis, the order topology of an ordered vector space $(X, \leq)$ is the finest locally convex topological vector space (TVS) topology on $X$ for which every order interval is bounded, where an order interval in $X$ is a set of the form $[a, b] := \left\{ z \in X : a \leq z \text{ and } z \leq b \right\}$ where $a$ and $b$ belong to $X.$

The order topology is an important topology that is used frequently in the theory of ordered topological vector spaces because the topology stems directly from the algebraic and order theoretic properties of $(X, \leq),$ rather than from some topology that $X$ starts out having. This allows for establishing intimate connections between this topology and the algebraic and order theoretic properties of $(X, \leq).$ For many ordered topological vector spaces that occur in analysis, their topologies are identical to the order topology.

== Definitions ==
The family of all locally convex topologies on $X$ for which every order interval is bounded is non-empty (since it contains the coarsest possible topology on $X$) and the order topology is the upper bound of this family.

A subset of $X$ is a neighborhood of the origin in the order topology if and only if it is convex and absorbs every order interval in $X.$ A neighborhood of the origin in the order topology is necessarily an absorbing set because $[x, x] := \{ x \}$ for all $x \in X.$

For every $a \geq 0,$ let $X_a = \bigcup_{n=1}^{\infty} n [-a, a]$ and endow $X_a$ with its order topology (which makes it into a normable space). The set of all $X_a$'s is directed under inclusion and if $X_a \subseteq X_b$ then the natural inclusion of $X_a$ into $X_b$ is continuous. If $X$ is a regularly ordered vector space over the reals and if $H$ is any subset of the positive cone $C$ of $X$ that is cofinal in $C$ (e.g. $H$ could be $C$), then $X$ with its order topology is the inductive limit of $\left\{ X_a : a \geq 0 \right\}$ (where the bonding maps are the natural inclusions).

The lattice structure can compensate in part for any lack of an order unit:

Theorem—Let $X$ be a vector lattice with a regular order and let $C$ denote its positive cone. Then the order topology on $X$ is the finest locally convex topology on $X$ for which $C$ is a normal cone; it is also the same as the Mackey topology induced on $X$ with respect to the duality $\left\langle X, X^{+} \right\rangle.$

In particular, if $(X, \tau)$ is an ordered Fréchet lattice over the real numbers then $\tau$ is the ordered topology on $X$ if and only if the positive cone of $X$ is a normal cone in $(X, \tau).$

If $X$ is a regularly ordered vector lattice then the ordered topology is the finest locally convex TVS topology on $X$ making $X$ into a locally convex vector lattice. If in addition $X$ is order complete then $X$ with the order topology is a barreled space and every band decomposition of $X$ is a topological direct sum for this topology. In particular, if the order of a vector lattice $X$ is regular then the order topology is generated by the family of all lattice seminorms on $X.$

== Properties ==
Throughout, $(X, \leq)$ will be an ordered vector space and $\tau_{\leq}$ will denote the order topology on $X.$

- The dual of $\left(X, \tau_{\leq}\right)$ is the order bound dual $X_b$ of $X.$
- If $X_b$ separates points in $X$ (such as if $(X, \leq)$ is regular) then $\left(X, \tau_{\leq}\right)$ is a bornological locally convex TVS.
- Each positive linear operator between two ordered vector spaces is continuous for the respective order topologies.
- Each order unit of an ordered TVS is interior to the positive cone for the order topology.
- If the order of an ordered vector space $X$ is a regular order and if each positive sequence of type $\ell^1$ in $X$ is order summable, then $X$ endowed with its order topology is a barreled space.
- If the order of an ordered vector space $X$ is a regular order and if for all $x \geq 0$ and $y \geq 0$ $[0, x] + [0, y] = [0, x + y]$ holds, then the positive cone of $X$ is a normal cone in $X$ when $X$ is endowed with the order topology. In particular, the continuous dual space of $X$ with the order topology will be the order dual $X$^{+}.
- If $(X, \leq)$ is an Archimedean ordered vector space over the real numbers having an order unit and let $\tau_{\leq}$ denote the order topology on $X.$ Then $\left(X, \tau_{\leq}\right)$ is an ordered TVS that is normable, $\tau_{\leq}$ is the finest locally convex TVS topology on $X$ such that the positive cone is normal, and the following are equivalent:
1. $\left(X, \tau_{\leq}\right)$ is complete.
2. Each positive sequence of type $\ell^1$ in $X$ is order summable.
- In particular, if $(X, \leq)$ is an Archimedean ordered vector space having an order unit then the order $\,\leq\,$ is a regular order and $X_b = X^+.$
- If $X$ is a Banach space and an ordered vector space with an order unit then $X$'s topological is identical to the order topology if and only if the positive cone of $X$ is a normal cone in $X.$
- A vector lattice homomorphism from $X$ into $Y$ is a topological homomorphism when $X$ and $Y$ are given their respective order topologies.

== Relation to subspaces, quotients, and products ==
If $M$ is a solid vector subspace of a vector lattice $X,$ then the order topology of $X / M$ is the quotient of the order topology on $X.$

== Examples ==
The order topology of a finite product of ordered vector spaces (this product having its canonical order) is identical to the product topology of the topological product of the constituent ordered vector spaces (when each is given its order topology).

== See also ==
- Generalised metric – Metric geometry
- Order topology – Certain topology in mathematics
- Ordered topological vector space
- Ordered vector space – Vector space with a partial order
- Vector lattice – Partially ordered vector space, ordered as a lattice

== Bibliography ==
- Narici, Lawrence; Beckenstein, Edward (2011). Topological Vector Spaces. Pure and applied mathematics (Second ed.). Boca Raton, FL: CRC Press. ISBN 978-1584888666. OCLC 144216834.
- Schaefer, Helmut H.; Wolff, Manfred P. (1999). Topological Vector Spaces. GTM. Vol. 8 (Second ed.). New York, NY: Springer New York Imprint Springer. ISBN 978-1-4612-7155-0. OCLC 840278135.
