= Positive linear operator =

Concept in functional analysis

In mathematics, more specifically in functional analysis, a positive linear operator from an preordered vector space $(X, \leq)$ into a preordered vector space $(Y, \leq)$ is a linear operator $f$ on $X$ into $Y$ such that for all positive elements $x$ of $X,$ that is $x \geq 0,$ it holds that $f(x) \geq 0.$ In other words, a positive linear operator maps the positive cone of the domain into the positive cone of the codomain.

Every positive linear functional is a type of positive linear operator. The significance of positive linear operators lies in results such as Riesz–Markov–Kakutani representation theorem.

== Definition ==
A linear function $f$ on a preordered vector space is called positive if it satisfies either of the following equivalent conditions:

1. $x \geq 0$ implies $f(x) \geq 0.$
2. if $x \leq y$ then $f(x) \leq f(y).$

The set of all positive linear forms on a vector space with positive cone $C,$ called the dual cone and denoted by $C^*,$ is a cone equal to the polar of $-C.$ The preorder induced by the dual cone on the space of linear functionals on $X$ is called the dual preorder.

The order dual of an ordered vector space $X$ is the set, denoted by $X^+,$ defined by $X^+ := C^* - C^*.$

== Canonical ordering ==
Let $(X, \leq)$ and $(Y, \leq)$ be preordered vector spaces and let $\mathcal{L}(X; Y)$ be the space of all linear maps from $X$ into $Y.$ The set $H$ of all positive linear operators in $\mathcal{L}(X; Y)$ is a cone in $\mathcal{L}(X; Y)$ that defines a preorder on $\mathcal{L}(X; Y)$. If $M$ is a vector subspace of $\mathcal{L}(X; Y)$ and if $H \cap M$ is a proper cone then this proper cone defines a canonical partial order on $M$ making $M$ into a partially ordered vector space.

If $(X, \leq)$ and $(Y, \leq)$ are ordered topological vector spaces and if $\mathcal{G}$ is a family of bounded subsets of $X$ whose union covers $X$ then the positive cone $\mathcal{H}$ in $L(X; Y)$, which is the space of all continuous linear maps from $X$ into $Y,$ is closed in $L(X; Y)$ when $L(X; Y)$ is endowed with the $\mathcal{G}$-topology. For $\mathcal{H}$ to be a proper cone in $L(X; Y)$ it is sufficient that the positive cone of $X$ be total in $X$ (that is, the span of the positive cone of $X$ be dense in $X$). If $Y$ is a locally convex space of dimension greater than 0 then this condition is also necessary. Thus, if the positive cone of $X$ is total in $X$ and if $Y$ is a locally convex space, then the canonical ordering of $L(X; Y)$ defined by $\mathcal{H}$ is a regular order.

== Properties ==
Proposition: Suppose that $X$ and $Y$ are ordered locally convex topological vector spaces with $X$ being a Mackey space on which every positive linear functional is continuous. If the positive cone of $Y$ is a weakly normal cone in $Y$ then every positive linear operator from $X$ into $Y$ is continuous.

Proposition: Suppose $X$ is a barreled ordered topological vector space (TVS) with positive cone $C$ that satisfies $X = C - C$ and $Y$ is a semi-reflexive ordered TVS with a positive cone $D$ that is a normal cone. Give $L(X; Y)$ its canonical order and let $\mathcal{U}$ be a subset of $L(X; Y)$ that is directed upward and either majorized (that is, bounded above by some element of $L(X; Y)$) or simply bounded. Then $u = \sup \mathcal{U}$ exists and the section filter $\mathcal{F}(\mathcal{U})$ converges to $u$ uniformly on every precompact subset of $X.$

== See also ==
- Cone-saturated
- Positive linear functional
- Vector lattice – Partially ordered vector space, ordered as a lattice
