= Positive linear functional =

In mathematics, more specifically in functional analysis, a positive linear functional on an ordered vector space $(V, \leq)$ is a linear functional $f$ on $V$ so that for all positive elements $v \in V,$ that is $v \geq 0,$ it holds that
$$f(v) \geq 0.$$

In other words, a positive linear functional is guaranteed to take nonnegative values for positive elements. The significance of positive linear functionals lies in results such as Riesz–Markov–Kakutani representation theorem.

When $V$ is a complex vector space, it is assumed that for all $v\ge0,$ $f(v)$ is real. As in the case when $V$ is a C*-algebra with its partially ordered subspace of self-adjoint elements, sometimes a partial order is placed on only a subspace $W\subseteq V,$ and the partial order does not extend to all of $V,$ in which case the positive elements of $V$ are the positive elements of $W,$ by abuse of notation. This implies that for a C*-algebra, a positive linear functional sends any $x \in V$ equal to $s^{\ast}s$ for some $s \in V$ to a real number, which is equal to its complex conjugate, and therefore all positive linear functionals preserve the self-adjointness of such $x.$ This property is exploited in the GNS construction to relate positive linear functionals on a C*-algebra to inner products.

== Sufficient conditions for continuity of all positive linear functionals ==
There is a comparatively large class of ordered topological vector spaces on which every positive linear form is necessarily continuous. This includes all topological vector lattices that are sequentially complete.

Theorem Let $X$ be an Ordered topological vector space with positive cone $C \subseteq X$ and let $\mathcal{B} \subseteq \mathcal{P}(X)$ denote the family of all bounded subsets of $X.$ Then each of the following conditions is sufficient to guarantee that every positive linear functional on $X$ is continuous:

1. $C$ has non-empty topological interior (in $X$).
2. $X$ is complete and metrizable and $X = C - C.$
3. $X$ is bornological and $C$ is a semi-complete strict $\mathcal{B}$-cone in $X.$
4. $X$ is the inductive limit of a family $\left(X_{\alpha} \right)_{\alpha \in A}$ of ordered Fréchet spaces with respect to a family of positive linear maps where $X_{\alpha} = C_{\alpha} - C_{\alpha}$ for all $\alpha \in A,$ where $C_{\alpha}$ is the positive cone of $X_{\alpha}.$

== Continuous positive extensions ==
The following theorem is due to H. Bauer and independently, to Namioka.

Theorem: Let $X$ be an ordered topological vector space (TVS) with positive cone $C,$ let $M$ be a vector subspace of $E,$ and let $f$ be a linear form on $M.$ Then $f$ has an extension to a continuous positive linear form on $X$ if and only if there exists some convex neighborhood $U$ of $0$ in $X$ such that $\operatorname{Re} f$ is bounded above on $M \cap (U - C).$

Corollary: Let $X$ be an ordered topological vector space with positive cone $C,$ let $M$ be a vector subspace of $E.$ If $C \cap M$ contains an interior point of $C$ then every continuous positive linear form on $M$ has an extension to a continuous positive linear form on $X.$

Corollary: Let $X$ be an ordered vector space with positive cone $C,$ let $M$ be a vector subspace of $E,$ and let $f$ be a linear form on $M.$ Then $f$ has an extension to a positive linear form on $X$ if and only if there exists some convex absorbing subset $W$ in $X$ containing the origin of $X$ such that $\operatorname{Re} f$ is bounded above on $M \cap (W - C).$

Proof: It suffices to endow $X$ with the finest locally convex topology making $W$ into a neighborhood of $0 \in X.$

== Examples ==
Consider, as an example of $V,$ the C*-algebra of complex square matrices with the positive elements being the positive-definite matrices. The trace function defined on this C*-algebra is a positive functional, as the eigenvalues of any positive-definite matrix are positive, and so its trace is positive.

Consider the Riesz space $\mathrm{C}_{\mathrm{c}}(X)$ of all continuous complex-valued functions of compact support on a locally compact Hausdorff space $X.$ Consider a Borel regular measure $\mu$ on $X,$ and a functional $\psi$ defined by
$$\psi(f) = \int_X f(x) d \mu(x) \quad \text{ for all } f \in \mathrm{C}_{\mathrm{c}}(X).$$
Then, this functional is positive (the integral of any positive function is a positive number). Moreover, any positive functional on this space has this form, as follows from the Riesz–Markov–Kakutani representation theorem.

== Positive linear functionals (C*-algebras) ==
Let $M$ be a C*-algebra (more generally, an operator system in a C*-algebra $A$) with identity $1.$ Let $M^+$ denote the set of positive elements in $M.$

A linear functional $\rho$ on $M$ is said to be positive if $\rho(a) \geq 0,$ for all $a \in M^+.$

Theorem. A linear functional $\rho$ on $M$ is positive if and only if $\rho$ is bounded and $\|\rho\| = \rho(1).$

=== Cauchy–Schwarz inequality ===
If $\rho$ is a positive linear functional on a C*-algebra $A,$ then one may define a semidefinite sesquilinear form on $A$ by $\langle a,b\rangle = \rho(b^{\ast}a).$ Thus from the Cauchy–Schwarz inequality we have
$$\left|\rho(b^{\ast}a)\right|^2 \leq \rho(a^{\ast}a) \cdot \rho(b^{\ast}b).$$

== Applications to economics ==
Given a space $C$, a price system can be viewed as a continuous, positive, linear functional on $C$.

== See also ==
- Positive element – Group with a compatible partial order
- Positive linear operator – Concept in functional analysis

== Bibliography ==
- Kadison, Richard, Fundamentals of the Theory of Operator Algebras, Vol. I : Elementary Theory, American Mathematical Society. ISBN 978-0821808191.
- Narici, Lawrence; Beckenstein, Edward (2011). Topological Vector Spaces. Pure and applied mathematics (Second ed.). Boca Raton, FL: CRC Press. ISBN 978-1584888666. OCLC 144216834.
- Schaefer, Helmut H.; Wolff, Manfred P. (1999). Topological Vector Spaces. GTM. Vol. 8 (Second ed.). New York, NY: Springer New York Imprint Springer. ISBN 978-1-4612-7155-0. OCLC 840278135.
- Trèves, François (2006) [1967]. Topological Vector Spaces, Distributions and Kernels. Mineola, N.Y.: Dover Publications. ISBN 978-0-486-45352-1. OCLC 853623322.
