= Ordered algebra =

In mathematics, an ordered algebra is an algebra over the real numbers $\mathbb{R}$ with unit e together with an associated order such that e is positive (i.e. e ≥ 0), the product of any two positive elements is again positive, and when A is considered as a vector space over $\mathbb{R}$ then it is an Archimedean ordered vector space.

== Properties ==
Let A be an ordered algebra with unit e and let C^{*} denote the cone in A^{*} (the algebraic dual of A) of all positive linear forms on A. If f is a linear form on A such that f(e) = 1 and f generates an extreme ray of C^{*} then f is a multiplicative homomorphism.

== Results ==
Stone's Algebra Theorem: Let A be an ordered algebra with unit e such that e is an order unit in A, let A^{*} denote the algebraic dual of A, and let K be the $\sigma\left( A^{*}, A \right)$-compact set of all multiplicative positive linear forms satisfying f(e) = 1. Then under the evaluation map, A is isomorphic to a dense subalgebra of $C_{\mathbb{R}}(X)$. If in addition every positive sequence of type l^{1} in A is order summable then A together with the Minkowski functional p_{e} is isomorphic to the Banach algebra $C_{\mathbb{R}}(X)$.

== See also ==
- Ordered vector space
- Riesz space

== Sources ==
- Schaefer, Helmut H.; Wolff, Manfred P. (1999). Topological Vector Spaces. GTM. Vol. 3. New York, NY: Springer New York Imprint Springer. ISBN 978-1-4612-7155-0. OCLC 840278135.
