= Regularly ordered =

Mathematical definition

In mathematics, specifically in order theory and functional analysis, an ordered vector space $X$ is said to be regularly ordered and its order is called regular if $X$ is Archimedean ordered and the order dual of $X$ distinguishes points in $X$. Being a regularly ordered vector space is an important property in the theory of topological vector lattices.

== Examples ==
Every ordered locally convex space is regularly ordered. The canonical orderings of subspaces, products, and direct sums of regularly ordered vector spaces are again regularly ordered.

== Properties ==
If $X$ is a regularly ordered vector lattice then the order topology on $X$ is the finest topology on $X$ making $X$ into a locally convex topological vector lattice.

== See also ==
- Vector lattice – Partially ordered vector space, ordered as a lattice

== Bibliography ==
- Narici, Lawrence; Beckenstein, Edward (2011). Topological Vector Spaces. Pure and applied mathematics (Second ed.). Boca Raton, FL: CRC Press. ISBN 978-1584888666. OCLC 144216834.
- Schaefer, Helmut H.; Wolff, Manfred P. (1999). Topological Vector Spaces. GTM. Vol. 8 (Second ed.). New York, NY: Springer New York Imprint Springer. ISBN 978-1-4612-7155-0. OCLC 840278135.
