= Abstract m-space =

Concept in order theory

In mathematics, specifically in order theory and functional analysis, an abstract m-space or an AM-space is a Banach lattice $(X, \| \cdot \|)$ whose norm satisfies $\left\| \sup \{ x, y \} \right\| = \sup \left\{ \| x \|, \| y \| \right\}$ for all x and y in the positive cone of X.

We say that an AM-space X is an AM-space with unit if in addition there exists some u ≥ 0 in X such that the interval [−u, u] := { z ∈ X : −u ≤ z and z ≤ u } is equal to the unit ball of X; such an element u is unique and an order unit of X.

== Examples ==
The strong dual of an AL-space is an AM-space with unit.

If X is an Archimedean ordered vector lattice, u is an order unit of X, and p_{u} is the Minkowski functional of $[u, -u] := \{ x \in X : -u \leq x \text{ and } x \leq x \},$ then the complete of the semi-normed space (X, p_{u}) is an AM-space with unit u.

== Properties ==
Every AM-space is isomorphic (as a Banach lattice) with some closed vector sublattice of some suitable $C_{\R}\left( X \right)$. The strong dual of an AM-space with unit is an AL-space.

If X ≠ { 0 } is an AM-space with unit then the set K of all extreme points of the positive face of the dual unit ball is a non-empty and weakly compact (i.e. $\sigma\left( X^{\prime}, X \right)$-compact) subset of $X^{\prime}$ and furthermore, the evaluation map $I : X \to C_{\R} \left( K \right)$ defined by $I(x) := I_x$ (where $I_x : K \to \R$ is defined by $I_x(t) = \langle x, t \rangle$) is an isomorphism.

== See also ==
- Vector lattice
- AL-space

== Bibliography ==
- Schaefer, Helmut H.; Wolff, Manfred P. (1999). Topological Vector Spaces. GTM. Vol. 8 (Second ed.). New York, NY: Springer New York Imprint Springer. ISBN 978-1-4612-7155-0. OCLC 840278135.
