= Ordered ring =

The real numbers are an ordered ring which is also an ordered field. The integers, a subset of the real numbers, are an ordered ring that is not an ordered field.

In abstract algebra, an ordered ring is a (usually commutative) ring R with a total order ≤ such that for all a, b, and c in R:

- if a ≤ b then a + c ≤ b + c.
- if 0 ≤ a and 0 ≤ b then 0 ≤ ab.

== Examples ==
Ordered rings are familiar from arithmetic. Examples include the integers, the rationals and the real numbers. (The rationals and reals in fact form ordered fields.) The complex numbers, in contrast, do not form an ordered ring or field, because there is no inherent order relationship between the elements 1 and i.

== Positive elements ==
In analogy with the real numbers, we call an element c of an ordered ring R positive if 0 < c, and negative if c < 0. 0 is considered to be neither positive nor negative.

The set of positive elements of an ordered ring R is often denoted by R_{+}. An alternative notation, favored in some disciplines, is to use R_{+} for the set of nonnegative elements, and R_{++} for the set of positive elements.

== Absolute value ==
If $a$ is an element of an ordered ring R, then the absolute value of $a$, denoted $|a|$, is defined thus:

$$|a| := \begin{cases} a, & \mbox{if }  0 \leq a,  \\ -a,  & \mbox{otherwise}, \end{cases}$$

where $-a$ is the additive inverse of $a$ and 0 is the additive identity element.

== Discrete ordered rings ==
A discrete ordered ring or discretely ordered ring is an ordered ring in which there is no element between 0 and 1. The integers are a discrete ordered ring, but the rational numbers are not.

== Basic properties ==
For all a, b and c in R:

- If a ≤ b and 0 ≤ c, then ac ≤ bc. This property is sometimes used to define ordered rings instead of the second property in the definition above.
- |ab| = |a| |b|.
- An ordered ring that is not trivial is infinite.
- Exactly one of the following is true: a is positive, −a is positive, or a = 0. This property follows from the fact that ordered rings are abelian, linearly ordered groups with respect to addition.
- In an ordered ring, no negative element is a square: Firstly, 0 is nonnegative. Now if a ≠ 0 and a = b^{2} then b ≠ 0 and a = (−b)^{2}; as either b or −b is positive, a must be nonnegative.

== See also ==
- Ordered field – Algebraic object with an ordered structure
- Ordered group – Group with a compatible partial order
- Ordered topological vector space
- Ordered vector space – Vector space with a partial order
- Partially ordered ring – Ring with a compatible partial order
- Partially ordered space – Partially ordered topological space
- Riesz space – Partially ordered vector space, ordered as a lattice, also called vector lattice
- Ordered semirings

== Notes ==
The list below includes references to theorems formally verified by the IsarMathLib project.
