= Abstract L-space =

In mathematics, specifically in order theory and functional analysis, an abstract L-space, an AL-space, or an abstract Lebesgue space is a Banach lattice $(X, \| \cdot \|)$ whose norm is additive on the positive cone of X.

In probability theory, it means the standard probability space.

== Examples ==
The strong dual of an AM-space with unit is an AL-space.

== Properties ==
The reason for the name abstract L-space is because every AL-space is isomorphic (as a Banach lattice) with some subspace of $L^1(\mu).$ Every AL-space X is an order complete vector lattice of minimal type; however, the order dual of X, denoted by X^{+}, is not of minimal type unless X is finite-dimensional. Each order interval in an AL-space is weakly compact.

The strong dual of an AL-space is an AM-space with unit. The continuous dual space $X^{\prime}$ (which is equal to X^{+}) of an AL-space X is a Banach lattice that can be identified with $C_{\R} ( K )$, where K is a compact extremally disconnected topological space; furthermore, under the evaluation map, X is isomorphic with the band of all real Radon measures 𝜇 on K such that for every majorized and directed subset S of $C_{\R} ( K ),$ we have $\lim_{f \in S} \mu ( f ) = \mu ( \sup S ).$

== See also ==
- Vector lattice – Partially ordered vector space, ordered as a lattice
- AM-space – Concept in order theory
