= Lattice disjoint =

Mathematical concept

In mathematics, specifically in order theory and functional analysis, two elements x and y of a vector lattice X are lattice disjoint or simply disjoint if $\inf \left\{ |x|, |y| \right\} = 0$, in which case we write $x \perp y$, where the absolute value of x is defined to be $|x| := \sup \left\{ x, - x \right\}$. We say that two sets A and B are lattice disjoint or disjoint if a and b are disjoint for all a in A and all b in B, in which case we write $A \perp B$. If A is the singleton set $\{ a \}$ then we will write $a \perp B$ in place of $\{ a \} \perp B$. For any set A, we define the disjoint complement to be the set $A^{\perp} := \left\{ x \in X : x \perp A \right\}$.

== Characterizations ==
Two elements x and y are disjoint if and only if $\sup\{ | x |, | y | \} = | x | + | y |$. If x and y are disjoint then $| x + y | = | x | + | y |$ and $\left(x + y \right)^{+} = x^{+} + y^{+}$, where for any element z, $z^{+} := \sup \left\{ z, 0 \right\}$ and $z^{-} := \sup \left\{ -z, 0 \right\}$.

== Properties ==
Disjoint complements are always bands, but the converse is not true in general. If A is a subset of X such that $x = \sup A$ exists, and if B is a subset lattice in X that is disjoint from A, then B is a lattice disjoint from $\{ x \}$.

=== Representation as a disjoint sum of positive elements ===
For any x in X, let $x^{+} := \sup \left\{ x, 0 \right\}$ and $x^{-} := \sup \left\{ -x, 0 \right\}$, where note that both of these elements are $\geq 0$ and $x = x^{+} - x^{-}$ with $| x | = x^{+} + x^{-}$. Then $x^{+}$ and $x^{-}$ are disjoint, and $x = x^{+} - x^{-}$ is the unique representation of x as the difference of disjoint elements that are $\geq 0$. For all x and y in X, $\left| x^{+} - y^{+} \right| \leq | x - y |$ and $x + y = \sup\{ x, y \} + \inf\{ x, y \}$. If y ≥ 0 and x ≤ y then x^{+} ≤ y. Moreover, $x \leq y$ if and only if $x^{+} \leq y^{+}$ and $x^{-} \leq x^{-1}$.

== See also ==
- Solid set
- Locally convex vector lattice
- Vector lattice

== Sources ==
- Schaefer, Helmut H.; Wolff, Manfred P. (1999). Topological Vector Spaces. GTM. Vol. 3. New York, NY: Springer New York Imprint Springer. ISBN 978-1-4612-7155-0. OCLC 840278135.
