= Order summable =

In mathematics, specifically in order theory and functional analysis, a sequence of positive elements $\left(x_i\right)_{i=1}^{\infty}$ in a preordered vector space $X$ (that is, $x_i \geq 0$ for all $i$) is called order summable if $\sup_{n = 1, 2, \ldots} \sum_{i=1}^n x_i$ exists in $X$. For any $1 \leq p \leq \infty$, we say that a sequence $\left(x_i\right)_{i=1}^{\infty}$ of positive elements of $X$ is of type $\ell^p$ if there exists some $z \in X$ and some sequence $\left(c_i\right)_{i=1}^{\infty}$ in $\ell^p$ such that $0 \leq x_i \leq c_i z$ for all $i$.

The notion of order summable sequences is related to the completeness of the order topology.

== See also ==
- Ordered topological vector space
- Order topology (functional analysis) – Topology of an ordered vector space
- Ordered vector space – Vector space with a partial order
- Vector lattice – Partially ordered vector space, ordered as a lattice

== Bibliography ==
- Narici, Lawrence; Beckenstein, Edward (2011). Topological Vector Spaces. Pure and applied mathematics (Second ed.). Boca Raton, FL: CRC Press. ISBN 978-1584888666. OCLC 144216834.
- Schaefer, Helmut H.; Wolff, Manfred P. (1999). Topological Vector Spaces. GTM. Vol. 8 (Second ed.). New York, NY: Springer New York Imprint Springer. ISBN 978-1-4612-7155-0. OCLC 840278135.
