= Partially ordered ring =

Ring with a compatible partial order

In abstract algebra, a partially ordered ring is a ring (A, +, ·), together with a compatible partial order, that is, a partial order $\,\leq\,$ on the underlying set A that is compatible with the ring operations in the sense that it satisfies:
$$x \leq y \text{ implies } x + z \leq y + z$$
and
$$0 \leq x \text{ and } 0 \leq y \text{ imply that } 0 \leq x \cdot y$$
for all $x, y, z\in A$. Various extensions of this definition exist that constrain the ring, the partial order, or both. For example, an Archimedean partially ordered ring is a partially ordered ring $(A, \leq)$ where $A$'s partially ordered additive group is Archimedean.

An ordered ring, also called a totally ordered ring, is a partially ordered ring $(A, \leq)$ where $\,\leq\,$ is additionally a total order.

An l-ring, or lattice-ordered ring, is a partially ordered ring $(A, \leq)$ where $\,\leq\,$ is additionally a lattice order.

== Properties ==
The additive group of a partially ordered ring is always a partially ordered group.

The set of non-negative elements of a partially ordered ring (the set of elements $x$ for which $0 \leq x,$ also called the positive cone of the ring) is closed under addition and multiplication, that is, if $P$ is the set of non-negative elements of a partially ordered ring, then $P + P \subseteq P$ and $P \cdot P \subseteq P.$ Furthermore, $P \cap (-P) = \{0\}.$

The mapping of the compatible partial order on a ring $A$ to the set of its non-negative elements is one-to-one; that is, the compatible partial order uniquely determines the set of non-negative elements, and a set of elements uniquely determines the compatible partial order if one exists.

If $S \subseteq A$ is a subset of a ring $A,$ and:

1. $0 \in S$
2. $S \cap (-S) = \{0\}$
3. $S + S \subseteq S$
4. $S \cdot S \subseteq S$

then the relation $\,\leq\,$ where $x \leq y$ if and only if $y - x \in S$ defines a compatible partial order on $A$ (that is, $(A, \leq)$ is a partially ordered ring).

In any l-ring, the absolute value $|x|$ of an element $x$ can be defined to be $x \vee(-x),$ where $x \vee y$ denotes the maximal element. For any $x$ and $y,$
$$|x \cdot y| \leq |x| \cdot |y|$$
holds.

== f-rings ==
An f-ring, or Pierce–Birkhoff ring, is a lattice-ordered ring $(A, \leq)$ in which $x \wedge y = 0$ and $0 \leq z$ imply that $zx \wedge y = xz \wedge y = 0$ for all $x, y, z \in A.$ They were first introduced by Garrett Birkhoff and Richard S. Pierce in 1956, in a paper titled "Lattice-ordered rings", in an attempt to restrict the class of l-rings so as to eliminate a number of pathological examples. For example, Birkhoff and Pierce demonstrated an l-ring with 1 in which 1 is not positive, even though it is a square. The additional hypothesis required of f-rings eliminates this possibility.

=== Example ===
Let $X$ be a Hausdorff space, and $\mathcal{C}(X)$ be the space of all continuous, real-valued functions on $X.$ $\mathcal{C}(X)$ is an Archimedean f-ring with 1 under the following pointwise operations:
$$[f + g](x) = f(x) + g(x)$$
$$[fg](x) = f(x) \cdot g(x)$$
$$[f \wedge g](x) = f(x) \wedge g(x).$$

From an algebraic point of view the rings $\mathcal{C}(X)$ are fairly rigid. For example, localisations, residue rings or limits of rings of the form $\mathcal{C}(X)$ are not of this form in general. A much more flexible class of f-rings containing all rings of continuous functions and resembling many of the properties of these rings is the class of real closed rings.

=== Properties ===
- A direct product of f-rings is an f-ring, an l-subring of an f-ring is an f-ring, and an l-homomorphic image of an f-ring is an f-ring.
- $|xy| = |x||y|$ in an f-ring.
- The category Arf consists of the Archimedean f-rings with 1 and the l-homomorphisms that preserve the identity.
- Every ordered ring is an f-ring, so every sub-direct union of ordered rings is also an f-ring. Assuming the axiom of choice, a theorem of Birkhoff shows the converse, and that an l-ring is an f-ring if and only if it is l-isomorphic to a sub-direct union of ordered rings. Some mathematicians take this to be the definition of an f-ring.

== See also ==
- Linearly ordered group – Group with translationally invariant total order
- Ordered field – Algebraic object with an ordered structure
- Ordered group – Group with a compatible partial order
- Ordered topological vector space
- Ordered vector space – Vector space with a partial order
- Partially ordered space – Partially ordered topological space
- Riesz space – Partially ordered vector space, ordered as a lattice
