= Positive cone =

Positive cone may refer to:

- Positive cone of an ordered field
- Positive cone of an ordered vector space
- Positive cone of a partially ordered group
