= Locally convex vector lattice =

In mathematics, specifically in order theory and functional analysis, a locally convex vector lattice (LCVL) is a topological vector lattice that is also a locally convex space. LCVLs are important in the theory of topological vector lattices.

== Lattice semi-norms ==
The Minkowski functional of a convex, absorbing, and solid set is a called a lattice semi-norm. Equivalently, it is a semi-norm $p$ such that $|y| \leq |x|$ implies $p(y) \leq p(x).$ The topology of a locally convex vector lattice is generated by the family of all continuous lattice semi-norms.

== Properties ==
Every locally convex vector lattice possesses a neighborhood base at the origin consisting of convex balanced solid absorbing sets.

The strong dual of a locally convex vector lattice $X$ is an order complete locally convex vector lattice (under its canonical order) and it is a solid subspace of the order dual of $X$; moreover, if $X$ is a barreled space then the continuous dual space of $X$ is a band in the order dual of $X$ and the strong dual of $X$ is a complete locally convex TVS.

If a locally convex vector lattice is barreled then its strong dual space is complete (this is not necessarily true if the space is merely a locally convex barreled space but not a locally convex vector lattice).

If a locally convex vector lattice $X$ is semi-reflexive then it is order complete and $X_b$ (that is, $\left( X, b\left(X, X^{\prime}\right) \right)$) is a complete TVS; moreover, if in addition every positive linear functional on $X$ is continuous then $X$ is of $X$ is of minimal type, the order topology $\tau_{\operatorname{O}}$ on $X$ is equal to the Mackey topology $\tau\left(X, X^{\prime}\right),$ and $\left(X, \tau_{\operatorname{O}}\right)$ is reflexive. Every reflexive locally convex vector lattice is order complete and a complete locally convex TVS whose strong dual is a barreled reflexive locally convex TVS that can be identified under the canonical evaluation map with the strong bidual (that is, the strong dual of the strong dual).

If a locally convex vector lattice $X$ is an infrabarreled TVS then it can be identified under the evaluation map with a topological vector sublattice of its strong bidual, which is an order complete locally convex vector lattice under its canonical order.

If $X$ is a separable metrizable locally convex ordered topological vector space whose positive cone $C$ is a complete subset of $X,$ then the set of quasi-interior points of $C$ is dense in $C.$

Theorem—Suppose that $X$ is an order complete locally convex vector lattice with topology $\tau$ and endow the bidual $X^{\prime\prime}$ of $X$ with its natural topology (that is, the topology of uniform convergence on equicontinuous subsets of $X^{\prime}$) and canonical order (under which it becomes an order complete locally convex vector lattice). The following are equivalent:

1. The evaluation map $X \to X^{\prime\prime}$ induces an isomorphism of $X$ with an order complete sublattice of $X^{\prime\prime}.$
2. For every majorized and directed subset $S$ of $X,$ the section filter of $S$ converges in $(X, \tau)$ (in which case it necessarily converges to $\sup S$).
3. Every order convergent filter in $X$ converges in $(X, \tau)$ (in which case it necessarily converges to its order limit).

Corollary—Let $X$ be an order complete vector lattice with a regular order. The following are equivalent:

1. $X$ is of minimal type.
2. For every majorized and direct subset $S$ of $X,$ the section filter of $S$ converges in $X$ when $X$ is endowed with the order topology.
3. Every order convergent filter in $X$ converges in $X$ when $X$ is endowed with the order topology.

Moreover, if $X$ is of minimal type then the order topology on $X$ is the finest locally convex topology on $X$ for which every order convergent filter converges.

If $(X, \tau)$ is a locally convex vector lattice that is bornological and sequentially complete, then there exists a family of compact spaces $\left(X_{\alpha}\right)_{\alpha \in A}$ and a family of $A$-indexed vector lattice embeddings $f_{\alpha} : C_{\R}\left(K_{\alpha}\right) \to X$ such that $\tau$ is the finest locally convex topology on $X$ making each $f_{\alpha}$ continuous.

== Examples ==
Every Banach lattice, normed lattice, and Fréchet lattice is a locally convex vector lattice.

== See also ==
- Banach lattice – Banach space with a compatible structure of a lattice
- Fréchet lattice – Topological vector lattice
- Normed lattice
- Vector lattice – Partially ordered vector space, ordered as a lattice

== Bibliography ==
- Narici, Lawrence; Beckenstein, Edward (2011). Topological Vector Spaces. Pure and applied mathematics (Second ed.). Boca Raton, FL: CRC Press. ISBN 978-1584888666. OCLC 144216834.
- Schaefer, Helmut H.; Wolff, Manfred P. (1999). Topological Vector Spaces. GTM. Vol. 8 (Second ed.). New York, NY: Springer New York Imprint Springer. ISBN 978-1-4612-7155-0. OCLC 840278135.
