= Band (order theory) =

In mathematics, specifically in order theory and functional analysis, a band in a vector lattice $X$ is a subspace $M$ of $X$ that is solid and such that for all $S \subseteq M$ such that $x = \sup S$ exists in $X,$ we have $x \in M.$ The smallest band containing a subset $S$ of $X$ is called the band generated by $S$ in $X.$ A band generated by a singleton set is called a principal band.

== Examples ==
For any subset $S$ of a vector lattice $X,$ the set $S^{\perp}$ of all elements of $X$ disjoint from $S$ is a band in $X.$

If $\mathcal{L}^p(\mu)$ ($1 \leq p \leq \infty$) is the usual space of real valued functions used to define Lp spaces $L^p,$ then $\mathcal{L}^p(\mu)$ is countably order complete (that is, each subset that is bounded above has a supremum) but in general is not order complete. If $N$ is the vector subspace of all $\mu$-null functions then $N$ is a solid subset of $\mathcal{L}^p(\mu)$ that is not a band.

== Properties ==
The intersection of an arbitrary family of bands in a vector lattice $X$ is a band in $X.$

== See also ==
- Solid set
- Locally convex vector lattice
- Vector lattice – Partially ordered vector space, ordered as a lattice
