= Weak order unit =

In mathematics, specifically in order theory and functional analysis, an element $x$ of a vector lattice $X$ is called a weak order unit in $X$ if $x \geq 0$ and also for all $y \in X,$ $\inf \{ x, |y| \} = 0 \text{ implies } y = 0.$

== Examples ==
- If $X$ is a separable Fréchet topological vector lattice then the set of weak order units is dense in the positive cone of $X.$

== See also ==
- Quasi-interior point
- Vector lattice – Partially ordered vector space, ordered as a lattice
