= Order dual (functional analysis) =

In mathematics, specifically in order theory and functional analysis, the order dual of an ordered vector space $X$ is the set $\operatorname{Pos}\left(X^*\right) - \operatorname{Pos}\left(X^*\right)$ where $\operatorname{Pos}\left(X^*\right)$ denotes the set of all positive linear functionals on $X$, where a linear function $f$ on $X$ is called positive if for all $x \in X,$ $x \geq 0$ implies $f(x) \geq 0.$ The order dual of $X$ is denoted by $X^+$. Along with the related concept of the order bound dual, this space plays an important role in the theory of ordered topological vector spaces.

== Canonical ordering ==
An element $f$ of the order dual of $X$ is called positive if $x \geq 0$ implies $\operatorname{Re} f(x) \geq 0.$ The positive elements of the order dual form a cone that induces an ordering on $X^+$ called the canonical ordering. If $X$ is an ordered vector space whose positive cone $C$ is generating (that is, $X = C - C$) then the order dual with the canonical ordering is an ordered vector space. The order dual is the span of the set of positive linear functionals on $X$.

== Properties ==
The order dual is contained in the order bound dual. If the positive cone of an ordered vector space $X$ is generating and if $[0, x] + [0, y] = [0, x + y]$ holds for all positive $x$ and $y$, then the order dual is equal to the order bound dual, which is an order complete vector lattice under its canonical ordering.

The order dual of a vector lattice is an order complete vector lattice. The order dual of a vector lattice $X$ can be finite dimension (possibly even $\{ 0 \}$) even if $X$ is infinite-dimensional.

== Order bidual ==
Suppose that $X$ is an ordered vector space such that the canonical order on $X^+$ makes $X^+$ into an ordered vector space. Then the order bidual is defined to be the order dual of $X^+$ and is denoted by $X^{++}$. If the positive cone of an ordered vector space $X$ is generating and if $[0, x] + [0, y] = [0, x + y]$ holds for all positive $x$ and $y$, then $X^{++}$ is an order complete vector lattice and the evaluation map $X \to X^{++}$ is order preserving. In particular, if $X$ is a vector lattice then $X^{++}$ is an order complete vector lattice.

== Minimal vector lattice ==
If $X$ is a vector lattice and if $G$ is a solid subspace of $X^+$ that separates points in $X$, then the evaluation map $X \to G^{+}$ defined by sending $x \in X$ to the map $E_x : G^{+} \to \Complex$ given by $E_x(f) := f(x)$, is a lattice isomorphism of $X$ onto a vector sublattice of $G^+$. However, the image of this map is in general not order complete even if $X$ is order complete. Indeed, a regularly ordered, order complete vector lattice need not be mapped by the evaluation map onto a band in the order bidual. An order complete, regularly ordered vector lattice whose canonical image in its order bidual is order complete is called minimal and is said to be of minimal type.

=== Examples ===
For any $1 < p < \infty$, the Banach lattice $L^p(\mu)$ is order complete and of minimal type; in particular, the norm topology on this space is the finest locally convex topology for which every order convergent filter converges.

=== Properties ===
Let $X$ be an order complete vector lattice of minimal type. For any $x \in X$ such that $x > 0,$ the following are equivalent:

1. $x$ is a weak order unit.
2. For every non-0 positive linear functional $f$ on $X$, $f(x) > 0.$
3. For each topology $\tau$ on $X$ such that $(X, \tau)$ is a locally convex vector lattice, $x$ is a quasi-interior point of its positive cone.

== Related concepts ==
An ordered vector space $X$ is called regularly ordered and its order is said to be regular if it is Archimedean ordered and $X^+$ distinguishes points in $X$.

== See also ==
- Algebraic dual space – In mathematics, vector space of linear forms
- Continuous dual space – In mathematics, vector space of linear forms
- Dual space – In mathematics, vector space of linear forms
- Order bound dual – Mathematical concept

== Bibliography ==
- Narici, Lawrence; Beckenstein, Edward (2011). Topological Vector Spaces. Pure and applied mathematics (Second ed.). Boca Raton, FL: CRC Press. ISBN 978-1584888666. OCLC 144216834.
- Schaefer, Helmut H.; Wolff, Manfred P. (1999). Topological Vector Spaces. GTM. Vol. 8 (Second ed.). New York, NY: Springer New York Imprint Springer. ISBN 978-1-4612-7155-0. OCLC 840278135.
