= Lattice group =

In mathematics, the term lattice group is used for two distinct notions:

- a lattice (group), a discrete subgroup of R^{n} and its generalizations
- a lattice ordered group, a group that with a partial ordering that is a lattice order
