= Order bound dual =

Mathematical concept

In mathematics, specifically in order theory and functional analysis, the order bound dual of an ordered vector space $X$ is the set of all linear functionals on $X$ that map order intervals, which are sets of the form $[a, b] := \{ x \in X : a \leq x \text{ and } x \leq b \},$ to bounded sets. The order bound dual of $X$ is denoted by $X^{\operatorname{b}}.$ This space plays an important role in the theory of ordered topological vector spaces.

== Canonical ordering ==
An element $g$ of the order bound dual of $X$ is called positive if $x \geq 0$ implies $\operatorname{Re}(f(x)) \geq 0.$ The positive elements of the order bound dual form a cone that induces an ordering on $X^{\operatorname{b}}$ called the canonical ordering. If $X$ is an ordered vector space whose positive cone $C$ is generating (meaning $X = C - C$) then the order bound dual with the canonical ordering is an ordered vector space.

== Properties ==
The order bound dual of an ordered vector spaces contains its order dual. If the positive cone of an ordered vector space $X$ is generating and if for all positive $x$ and $x$ we have $[0, x] + [0, y] = [0, x + y],$ then the order dual is equal to the order bound dual, which is an order complete vector lattice under its canonical ordering.

Suppose $X$ is a vector lattice and $f$ and $g$ are order bounded linear forms on $X.$ Then for all $x \in X,$

1. $\sup(f, g)(|x|) = \sup \{ f(y) + g(z) : y \geq 0, z \geq 0, \text{ and } y + z = |x| \}$
2. $\inf(f, g)(|x|) = \inf \{ f(y) + g(z) : y \geq 0, z \geq 0, \text{ and } y + z = |x| \}$
3. $|f|(|x|) = \sup \{ f(y - z) : y \geq 0, z \geq 0, \text{ and } y + z = |x| \}$
4. $|f(x)| \leq |f|(|x|)$
5. if $f \geq 0$ and $g \geq 0$ then $f$ and $g$ are lattice disjoint if and only if for each $x \geq 0$ and real $r > 0,$ there exists a decomposition $x = a + b$ with $a \geq 0, b \geq 0, \text{ and } f(a) + g(b) \leq r.$

== See also ==
- Algebraic dual space – In mathematics, vector space of linear forms
- Continuous dual space – In mathematics, vector space of linear forms
- Dual space – In mathematics, vector space of linear forms
- Order dual (functional analysis)
