= Order dual =

In mathematics, order dual may refer to:

- Converse relation of a partial order is sometimes called its order dual. Also called its dual order or its transpose, inverse, opposite, or converse.
- Duality (order theory), duality principle for ordered sets
- Order dual (functional analysis), set of all differences of any two positive linear functionals on an ordered vector space
