= Quasi-interior point =

In mathematics, specifically in order theory and functional analysis, an element $x$ of an ordered topological vector space $X$ is called a quasi-interior point of the positive cone $C$ of $X$ if $x \geq 0$ and if the order interval $[0, x] := \{ z \in X : 0 \leq z \text{ and } z \leq x \}$ is a total subset of $X$; that is, if the linear span of $[0, x]$ is a dense subset of $X.$

== Properties ==
If $X$ is a separable metrizable locally convex ordered topological vector space whose positive cone $C$ is a complete and total subset of $X,$ then the set of quasi-interior points of $C$ is dense in $C.$

== Examples ==
If $1 \leq p < \infty$ then a point in $L^p(\mu)$ is quasi-interior to the positive cone $C$ if and only it is a weak order unit, which happens if and only if the element (which recall is an equivalence class of functions) contains a function that is $>\, 0$ almost everywhere (with respect to $\mu$).

A point in $L^\infty(\mu)$ is quasi-interior to the positive cone $C$ if and only if it is interior to $C.$

== See also ==
- Weak order unit
- Vector lattice – Partially ordered vector space, ordered as a lattice

== Bibliography ==
- Narici, Lawrence; Beckenstein, Edward (2011). Topological Vector Spaces. Pure and applied mathematics (Second ed.). Boca Raton, FL: CRC Press. ISBN 978-1584888666. OCLC 144216834.
- Schaefer, Helmut H.; Wolff, Manfred P. (1999). Topological Vector Spaces. GTM. Vol. 8 (Second ed.). New York, NY: Springer New York Imprint Springer. ISBN 978-1-4612-7155-0. OCLC 840278135.
