= Preorder (disambiguation) =

The term preorder may refer to:

In mathematics:

- Preorder, a reflexive, transitive relation
- Preorder field, a field of sets structure on a set with preorder
- Preordered field, a field with a preorder
- Preordering, a vertex ordering from a tree or other graph traversal; see Depth-first search#Vertex orderings

In marketing:

- Pre-order – an order placed for an item which has not yet been released.
