= Archimedean ordered vector space =

Vector space with a binary relation

In mathematics, specifically in order theory, a binary relation $\,\leq\,$ on a vector space $X$ over the real or complex numbers is called Archimedean if for all $x \in X,$ whenever there exists some $y \in X$ such that $n x \leq y$ for all positive integers $n,$ then necessarily $x \leq 0.$ An Archimedean (pre)ordered vector space is a (pre)ordered vector space whose order is Archimedean. A preordered vector space $X$ is called almost Archimedean if for all $x \in X,$ whenever there exists a $y \in X$ such that $-n^{-1} y \leq x \leq n^{-1} y$ for all positive integers $n,$ then $x = 0.$

== Characterizations ==
A preordered vector space $(X, \leq)$ with an order unit $u$ is Archimedean preordered if and only if $n x \leq u$ for all non-negative integers $n$ implies $x \leq 0.$

== Properties ==
Let $X$ be an ordered vector space over the reals that is finite-dimensional. Then the order of $X$ is Archimedean if and only if the positive cone of $X$ is closed for the unique topology under which $X$ is a Hausdorff TVS (topological vector space).

== Order unit norm ==
Suppose $(X, \leq)$ is an ordered vector space over the reals with an order unit $u$ whose order is Archimedean and let $U = [-u, u].$ Then the Minkowski functional $p_U$ of $U$ (defined by $p_{U}(x) := \inf\left\{ r > 0 : x \in r [-u, u] \right\}$) is a norm called the order unit norm. It satisfies $p_U(u) = 1$ and the closed unit ball determined by $p_U$ is equal to $[-u, u]$ (that is, $[-u, u] = \{ x\in X : p_U(x) \leq 1 \}.$

=== Examples ===
The space $l_{\infin}(S, \R)$ of bounded real-valued maps on a set $S$ with the pointwise order is Archimedean ordered with an order unit $u := 1$ (that is, the function that is identically $1$ on $S$). The order unit norm on $l_{\infin}(S, \R)$ is identical to the usual sup norm: $\|f\| := \sup_{} |f(S)|.$

== Examples ==
Every order complete vector lattice is Archimedean ordered. A finite-dimensional vector lattice of dimension $n$ is Archimedean ordered if and only if it is isomorphic to $\R^n$ with its canonical order. However, a totally ordered vector order of dimension $\,> 1$ can not be Archimedean ordered. There exist ordered vector spaces that are almost Archimedean but not Archimedean.

The Euclidean space $\R^2$ over the reals with the lexicographic order is not Archimedean ordered since $r(0, 1) \leq (1, 1)$ for every $r > 0$ but $(0, 1) \neq (0, 0).$

== See also ==
- Archimedean property – Mathematical property of algebraic structures
- Ordered vector space – Vector space with a partial order

== Bibliography ==
- Narici, Lawrence; Beckenstein, Edward (2011). Topological Vector Spaces. Pure and applied mathematics (Second ed.). Boca Raton, FL: CRC Press. ISBN 978-1584888666. OCLC 144216834.
- Schaefer, Helmut H.; Wolff, Manfred P. (1999). Topological Vector Spaces. GTM. Vol. 8 (Second ed.). New York, NY: Springer New York Imprint Springer. ISBN 978-1-4612-7155-0. OCLC 840278135.
