= Normal cone (functional analysis) =

In mathematics, specifically in order theory and functional analysis, if $C$ is a cone at the origin in a topological vector space $X$ such that $0 \in C$ and if $\mathcal{U}$ is the neighborhood filter at the origin, then $C$ is called normal if $\mathcal{U} = \left[ \mathcal{U} \right]_C,$ where $\left[ \mathcal{U} \right]_C := \left\{ [ U ]_C : U \in \mathcal{U} \right\}$ and where for any subset $S \subseteq X,$ $[S]_C := (S + C) \cap (S - C)$ is the $C$-saturatation of $S.$

Normal cones play an important role in the theory of ordered topological vector spaces and topological vector lattices.

== Characterizations ==
If $C$ is a cone in a TVS $X$ then for any subset $S \subseteq X$ let $[S]_C := \left(S + C\right) \cap \left(S - C\right)$ be the $C$-saturated hull of $S \subseteq X$ and for any collection $\mathcal{S}$ of subsets of $X$ let $\left[ \mathcal{S} \right]_C := \left\{ \left[ S \right]_C : S \in \mathcal{S} \right\}.$ If $C$ is a cone in a TVS $X$ then $C$ is normal if $\mathcal{U} = \left[ \mathcal{U} \right]_C,$ where $\mathcal{U}$ is the neighborhood filter at the origin.

If $\mathcal{T}$ is a collection of subsets of $X$ and if $\mathcal{F}$ is a subset of $\mathcal{T}$ then $\mathcal{F}$ is a fundamental subfamily of $\mathcal{T}$ if every $T \in \mathcal{T}$ is contained as a subset of some element of $\mathcal{F}.$ If $\mathcal{G}$ is a family of subsets of a TVS $X$ then a cone $C$ in $X$ is called a $\mathcal{G}$-cone if $\left\{ \overline{\left[ G \right]_C} : G \in \mathcal{G} \right\}$ is a fundamental subfamily of $\mathcal{G}$ and $C$ is a strict $\mathcal{G}$-cone if $\left\{ \left[ G \right]_C : G \in \mathcal{G} \right\}$ is a fundamental subfamily of $\mathcal{G}.$ Let $\mathcal{B}$ denote the family of all bounded subsets of $X.$

If $C$ is a cone in a TVS $X$ (over the real or complex numbers), then the following are equivalent:

1. $C$ is a normal cone.
2. For every filter $\mathcal{F}$ in $X,$ if $\lim \mathcal{F} = 0$ then $\lim \left[ \mathcal{F} \right]_C = 0.$
3. There exists a neighborhood base $\mathcal{G}$ in $X$ such that $B \in \mathcal{G}$ implies $\left[ B \cap C \right]_C \subseteq B.$

and if $X$ is a vector space over the reals then we may add to this list:

4. There exists a neighborhood base at the origin consisting of convex, balanced, $C$-saturated sets.
5. There exists a generating family $\mathcal{P}$ of semi-norms on $X$ such that $p(x) \leq p(x + y)$ for all $x, y \in C$ and $p \in \mathcal{P}.$

and if $X$ is a locally convex space and if the dual cone of $C$ is denoted by $X^{\prime}$ then we may add to this list:

6. For any equicontinuous subset $S \subseteq X^{\prime},$ there exists an equicontiuous $B \subseteq C^{\prime}$ such that $S \subseteq B - B.$
7. The topology of $X$ is the topology of uniform convergence on the equicontinuous subsets of $C^{\prime}.$

and if $X$ is an infrabarreled locally convex space and if $\mathcal{B}^{\prime}$ is the family of all strongly bounded subsets of $X^{\prime}$ then we may add to this list:

8. The topology of $X$ is the topology of uniform convergence on strongly bounded subsets of $C^{\prime}.$
9. $C^{\prime}$ is a $\mathcal{B}^{\prime}$-cone in $X^{\prime}.$
  - this means that the family $\left\{ \overline{\left[ B^{\prime} \right]_C} : B^{\prime} \in \mathcal{B}^{\prime} \right\}$ is a fundamental subfamily of $\mathcal{B}^{\prime}.$
10. $C^{\prime}$ is a strict $\mathcal{B}^{\prime}$-cone in $X^{\prime}.$
  - this means that the family $\left\{ \left[ B^{\prime} \right]_C : B^{\prime} \in \mathcal{B}^{\prime} \right\}$ is a fundamental subfamily of $\mathcal{B}^{\prime}.$

and if $X$ is an ordered locally convex TVS over the reals whose positive cone is $C,$ then we may add to this list:

11. there exists a Hausdorff locally compact topological space $S$ such that $X$ is isomorphic (as an ordered TVS) with a subspace of $R(S),$ where $R(S)$ is the space of all real-valued continuous functions on $X$ under the topology of compact convergence.

If $X$ is a locally convex TVS, $C$ is a cone in $X$ with dual cone $C^{\prime} \subseteq X^{\prime},$ and $\mathcal{G}$ is a saturated family of weakly bounded subsets of $X^{\prime},$ then

1. if $C^{\prime}$ is a $\mathcal{G}$-cone then $C$ is a normal cone for the $\mathcal{G}$-topology on $X$;
2. if $C$ is a normal cone for a $\mathcal{G}$-topology on $X$ consistent with $\left\langle X, X^{\prime}\right\rangle$ then $C^{\prime}$ is a strict $\mathcal{G}$-cone in $X^{\prime}.$

If $X$ is a Banach space, $C$ is a closed cone in $X,$, and $\mathcal{B}^{\prime}$ is the family of all bounded subsets of $X^{\prime}_b$ then the dual cone $C^{\prime}$ is normal in $X^{\prime}_b$ if and only if $C$ is a strict $\mathcal{B}$-cone.

If $X$ is a Banach space and $C$ is a cone in $X$ then the following are equivalent:

1. $C$ is a $\mathcal{B}$-cone in $X$;
2. $X = \overline{C} - \overline{C}$;
3. $\overline{C}$ is a strict $\mathcal{B}$-cone in $X.$

=== Ordered topological vector spaces ===
Suppose $L$ is an ordered topological vector space. That is, $L$ is a topological vector space, and we define $x \geq y$ whenever $x - y$ lies in the cone $L_+$. The following statements are equivalent:

1. The cone $L_+$ is normal;
2. The normed space $L$ admits an equivalent monotone norm;
3. There exists a constant $c > 0$ such that $a \leq x \leq b$ implies $\lVert x \rVert \leq c \max\{\lVert a \rVert, \lVert b \rVert\}$;
4. The full hull $[U] = (U + L_+) \cap (U - L_+)$ of the closed unit ball $U$ of $L$ is norm bounded;
5. There is a constant $c > 0$ such that $0 \leq x \leq y$ implies $\lVert x \rVert \leq c \lVert y \rVert$.

== Properties ==
- If $X$ is a Hausdorff TVS then every normal cone in $X$ is a proper cone.
- If $X$ is a normable space and if $C$ is a normal cone in $X$ then $X^{\prime} = C^{\prime} - C^{\prime}.$
- Suppose that the positive cone of an ordered locally convex TVS $X$ is weakly normal in $X$ and that $Y$ is an ordered locally convex TVS with positive cone $D.$ If $Y = D - D$ then $H - H$ is dense in $L_s(X; Y)$ where $H$ is the canonical positive cone of $L(X; Y)$ and $L_{s}(X; Y)$ is the space $L(X; Y)$ with the topology of simple convergence.
  - If $\mathcal{G}$ is a family of bounded subsets of $X,$ then there are apparently no simple conditions guaranteeing that $H$ is a $\mathcal{T}$-cone in $L_{\mathcal{G}}(X; Y),$ even for the most common types of families $\mathcal{T}$ of bounded subsets of $L_{\mathcal{G}}(X; Y)$ (except for very special cases).

== Sufficient conditions ==
If the topology on $X$ is locally convex then the closure of a normal cone is a normal cone.

Suppose that $\left\{ X_{\alpha} : \alpha \in A \right\}$ is a family of locally convex TVSs and that $C_\alpha$ is a cone in $X_{\alpha}.$ If $X := \bigoplus_{\alpha} X_{\alpha}$ is the locally convex direct sum then the cone $C := \bigoplus_{\alpha} C_\alpha$ is a normal cone in $X$ if and only if each $X_{\alpha}$ is normal in $X_{\alpha}.$

If $X$ is a locally convex space then the closure of a normal cone is a normal cone.

If $C$ is a cone in a locally convex TVS $X$ and if $C^{\prime}$ is the dual cone of $C,$ then $X^{\prime} = C^{\prime} - C^{\prime}$ if and only if $C$ is weakly normal. Every normal cone in a locally convex TVS is weakly normal. In a normed space, a cone is normal if and only if it is weakly normal.

If $X$ and $Y$ are ordered locally convex TVSs and if $\mathcal{G}$ is a family of bounded subsets of $X,$ then if the positive cone of $X$ is a $\mathcal{G}$-cone in $X$ and if the positive cone of $Y$ is a normal cone in $Y$ then the positive cone of $L_{\mathcal{G}}(X; Y)$ is a normal cone for the $\mathcal{G}$-topology on $L(X; Y).$

== See also ==
- Cone-saturated
- Topological vector lattice
- Vector lattice – Partially ordered vector space, ordered as a lattice

== Bibliography ==
- Narici, Lawrence; Beckenstein, Edward (2011). Topological Vector Spaces. Pure and applied mathematics (Second ed.). Boca Raton, FL: CRC Press. ISBN 978-1584888666. OCLC 144216834.
- Schaefer, Helmut H.; Wolff, Manfred P. (1999). Topological Vector Spaces. GTM. Vol. 8 (Second ed.). New York, NY: Springer New York Imprint Springer. ISBN 978-1-4612-7155-0. OCLC 840278135.
