= Cone-saturated =

In mathematics, specifically in order theory and functional analysis, if $C$ is a cone at 0 in a vector space $X$ such that $0 \in C,$ then a subset $S \subseteq X$ is said to be $C$-saturated if $S = [S]_C,$ where $[S]_C := (S + C) \cap (S - C).$ Given a subset $S \subseteq X,$ the $C$-saturated hull of $S$ is the smallest $C$-saturated subset of $X$ that contains $S.$ If $\mathcal{F}$ is a collection of subsets of $X$ then $\left[ \mathcal{F} \right]_C := \left\{ [F]_C : F \in \mathcal{F} \right\}.$

If $\mathcal{T}$ is a collection of subsets of $X$ and if $\mathcal{F}$ is a subset of $\mathcal{T}$ then $\mathcal{F}$ is a fundamental subfamily of $\mathcal{T}$ if every $T \in \mathcal{T}$ is contained as a subset of some element of $\mathcal{F}.$ If $\mathcal{G}$ is a family of subsets of a TVS $X$ then a cone $C$ in $X$ is called a $\mathcal{G}$-cone if $\left\{ \overline{[G]_C} : G \in \mathcal{G} \right\}$ is a fundamental subfamily of $\mathcal{G}$ and $C$ is a strict $\mathcal{G}$-cone if $\left\{ [B]_C : B \in \mathcal{B} \right\}$ is a fundamental subfamily of $\mathcal{B}.$

$C$-saturated sets play an important role in the theory of ordered topological vector spaces and topological vector lattices.

== Properties ==
If $X$ is an ordered vector space with positive cone $C$ then $[S]_C = \bigcup \left\{ [x, y] : x, y \in S \right\}.$

The map $S \mapsto [S]_C$ is increasing; that is, if $R \subseteq S$ then $[R]_C \subseteq [S]_C.$ If $S$ is convex then so is $[S]_C.$ When $X$ is considered as a vector field over $\R,$ then if $S$ is balanced then so is $[S]_C.$

If $\mathcal{F}$ is a filter base (resp. a filter) in $X$ then the same is true of $\left[ \mathcal{F} \right]_C := \left\{ [ F ]_C : F \in \mathcal{F} \right\}.$

== See also ==
- Banach lattice – Banach space with a compatible structure of a lattice
- Fréchet lattice – Topological vector lattice
- Locally convex vector lattice
- Vector lattice – Partially ordered vector space, ordered as a lattice

== Bibliography ==
- Narici, Lawrence; Beckenstein, Edward (2011). Topological Vector Spaces. Pure and applied mathematics (Second ed.). Boca Raton, FL: CRC Press. ISBN 978-1584888666. OCLC 144216834.
- Schaefer, Helmut H.; Wolff, Manfred P. (1999). Topological Vector Spaces. GTM. Vol. 8 (Second ed.). New York, NY: Springer New York Imprint Springer. ISBN 978-1-4612-7155-0. OCLC 840278135.
