= Riesz–Markov–Kakutani representation theorem =

Statement about linear functionals and measures

In mathematics, the Riesz–Markov–Kakutani representation theorem relates linear functionals on spaces of continuous functions on a locally compact space to measures in measure theory. The theorem is named for Frigyes Riesz (1909) who introduced it for continuous functions on the unit interval, Andrey Markov (1938) who extended the result to some non-compact spaces, and Shizuo Kakutani (1941) who extended the result to compact Hausdorff spaces.

There are many closely related variations of the theorem, as the linear functionals can be complex, real, or positive, the space they are defined on may be the unit interval or a compact space or a locally compact space, the continuous functions may be vanishing at infinity or have compact support, and the measures can be Baire measures or regular Borel measures or Radon measures or signed measures or complex measures.

== The representation theorem for positive linear functionals on C_{c}(X) ==
The statement of the theorem for positive linear functionals on C_{c}(X), the space of compactly supported complex-valued continuous functions, is as follows:

Theorem Let X be a locally compact Hausdorff space and $\psi$ a positive linear functional on C_{c}(X). Then there exists a unique positive Borel measure $\mu$ on X such that

$$\psi(f) = \int_X f(x) \, d\mu(x), \quad \forall f \in C_c(X),$$

which has the following additional properties for some $\Sigma$ containing the Borel σ-algebra on X:

- $\mu(K)<\infty$ for every compact $K\subset X$,
- Outer regularity: $\mu(E) = \inf \{\mu(U): E \subseteq U, U \mbox{ open}\}$ holds for every Borel set $E\in\Sigma$;
- Inner regularity: $\mu(E) = \sup \{\mu(K): K \subseteq E, K \mbox{ compact}\}$ holds whenever $E$ is open or when $E$ is Borel and $\mu(E)<\infty$;
- $(X,\Sigma,\mu)$ is a complete measure space

One approach to measure theory is to start with a Radon measure, defined as a positive linear functional on C_{c}(X). This is the way adopted by Bourbaki; it does of course assume that X starts life as a topological space, rather than simply as a set. For locally compact spaces an integration theory is then recovered.

Without the condition of regularity the Borel measure need not be unique. For example, let X be the set of ordinals at most equal to the first uncountable ordinal Ω, with the topology generated by "open intervals". The linear functional taking a continuous function to its value at Ω corresponds to the regular Borel measure with a point mass at Ω. However it also corresponds to the (non-regular) Borel measure that assigns measure 1 to any Borel set $B\subseteq [0,\Omega]$ if there is closed and unbounded set $C\subseteq [0,\Omega]$ with $C\subseteq B$, and assigns measure 0 to other Borel sets. (In particular the singleton $\{\Omega\}$ gets measure 0, contrary to the point mass measure.)

== The representation theorem for the continuous dual of C_{0}(X) ==
The following representation, also referred to as the Riesz–Markov theorem, gives a concrete realisation of the topological dual space of C_{0}(X), the set of continuous functions on X which vanish at infinity.

Theorem Let X be a locally compact Hausdorff space. For any continuous linear functional $\psi$ on C_{0}(X), there is a unique complex-valued regular Borel measure $\mu$ on X such that

$$\psi(f) = \int_X f(x) \, d \mu(x), \quad \forall f \in C_0(X).$$

A complex-valued Borel measure $\mu$ is called regular if the positive measure $| \mu |$ satisfies the regularity conditions defined above. The norm of $\psi$ as a linear functional is the total variation of $\mu$, that is

$$\|\psi\| = |\mu|(X).$$

Finally, $\psi$ is positive if and only if the measure $\mu$ is positive.

One can deduce this statement about linear functionals from the statement about positive linear functionals by first showing that a bounded linear functional can be written as a finite linear combination of positive ones.

== Historical remark ==
In its original form by Frigyes Riesz (1909) the theorem states that every continuous linear functional A over the space C([0, 1]) of continuous functions f in the interval [0, 1] can be represented as

$$A[f(x)] = \int_0^1 f(x)\,d\alpha(x),$$

where α(x) is a function of bounded variation on the interval [0, 1], and the integral is a Riemann–Stieltjes integral. Since there is a one-to-one correspondence between Borel regular measures in the interval and functions of bounded variation (that assigns to each function of bounded variation the corresponding Lebesgue–Stieltjes measure, and the integral with respect to the Lebesgue–Stieltjes measure agrees with the Riemann–Stieltjes integral for continuous functions), the above stated theorem generalizes the original statement of F. Riesz.
