= Topological vector lattice =

In mathematics, specifically in functional analysis and order theory, a topological vector lattice is a Hausdorff topological vector space (TVS) $X$ that has a partial order $\,\leq\,$ making it into vector lattice that possesses a neighborhood base at the origin consisting of solid sets. Ordered vector lattices have important applications in spectral theory.

== Definition ==
If $X$ is a vector lattice then by the vector lattice operations we mean the following maps:

1. the three maps $X$ to itself defined by $x \mapsto|x |$, $x \mapsto x^+$, $x \mapsto x^{-}$, and
2. the two maps from $X \times X$ into $X$ defined by $(x, y) \mapsto \sup_{} \{ x, y \}$ and$(x, y) \mapsto \inf_{} \{ x, y \}$.

If $X$ is a TVS over the reals and a vector lattice, then $X$ is locally solid if and only if (1) its positive cone is a normal cone, and (2) the vector lattice operations are continuous.

If $X$ is a vector lattice and an ordered topological vector space that is a Fréchet space in which the positive cone is a normal cone, then the lattice operations are continuous.

If $X$ is a topological vector space (TVS) and an ordered vector space then $X$ is called locally solid if $X$ possesses a neighborhood base at the origin consisting of solid sets. A topological vector lattice is a Hausdorff TVS $X$ that has a partial order $\,\leq\,$ making it into vector lattice that is locally solid.

== Properties ==
Every topological vector lattice has a closed positive cone and is thus an ordered topological vector space. Let $\mathcal{B}$ denote the set of all bounded subsets of a topological vector lattice with positive cone $C$ and for any subset $S$, let $[S]_C := (S + C) \cap (S - C)$ be the $C$-saturated hull of $S$. Then the topological vector lattice's positive cone $C$ is a strict $\mathcal{B}$-cone, where $C$ is a strict $\mathcal{B}$-cone means that $\left\{ [B]_C : B \in \mathcal{B} \right\}$ is a fundamental subfamily of $\mathcal{B}$ that is, every $B \in \mathcal{B}$ is contained as a subset of some element of $\left\{ [B]_C : B \in \mathcal{B} \right\}$).

If a topological vector lattice $X$ is order complete then every band is closed in $X$.

== Examples ==
The L^{p} spaces ($1 \leq p \leq \infty$) are Banach lattices under their canonical orderings. These spaces are order complete for $p < \infty$.

== See also ==
- Banach lattice – Banach space with a compatible structure of a lattice
- Complemented lattice
- Fréchet lattice – Topological vector lattice
- Locally convex vector lattice
- Normed lattice
- Ordered vector space – Vector space with a partial order
- Pseudocomplement
- Riesz space – Partially ordered vector space, ordered as a lattice

== Bibliography ==
- Narici, Lawrence; Beckenstein, Edward (2011). Topological Vector Spaces. Pure and applied mathematics (Second ed.). Boca Raton, FL: CRC Press. ISBN 978-1584888666. OCLC 144216834.
- Schaefer, Helmut H.; Wolff, Manfred P. (1999). Topological Vector Spaces. GTM. Vol. 8 (Second ed.). New York, NY: Springer New York Imprint Springer. ISBN 978-1-4612-7155-0. OCLC 840278135.
