= Order unit =

Element of an ordered vector space

An order unit is an element of an ordered vector space which can be used to bound all elements from above. In this way (as seen in the first example below) the order unit generalizes the unit element in the reals.

According to H. H. Schaefer, "most of the ordered vector spaces occurring in analysis do not have order units."

== Definition ==
For the ordering cone $K \subseteq X$ in the vector space $X$, the element $e \in K$ is an order unit (more precisely a $K$-order unit) if for every $x \in X$ there exists a $\lambda_x > 0$ such that $\lambda_x e - x \in K$ (that is, $x \leq_K \lambda_x e$).

=== Equivalent definition ===
The order units of an ordering cone $K \subseteq X$ are those elements in the algebraic interior of $K;$ that is, given by $\operatorname{core}(K).$

== Examples ==
Let $X = \R$ be the real numbers and $K = \R_+ = \{x \in \R : x \geq 0\},$ then the unit element $1$ is an order unit.

Let $X = \R^n$ and $K = \R^n_+ = \left\{ x_i \in \R : \text{ for all } i = 1, \ldots, n : x_i \geq 0 \right\},$ then the unit element $\vec{1} = (1, \ldots, 1)$ is an order unit.

Each interior point of the positive cone of an ordered topological vector space is an order unit.

== Properties ==
Each order unit of an ordered TVS is interior to the positive cone for the order topology.

If $(X, \leq)$ is a preordered vector space over the reals with order unit $u,$ then the map $p(x) := \inf \{ t \in \R : x \leq t u \}$ is a sublinear functional.

== Order unit norm ==
Suppose $(X, \leq)$ is an ordered vector space over the reals with order unit $u$ whose order is Archimedean and let $U = [-u, u].$ Then the Minkowski functional $p_U$ of $U,$ defined by $p_{U}(x) := \inf \{ r > 0 : x \in r [-u, u] \},$ is a norm called the order unit norm. It satisfies $p_U(u) = 1$ and the closed unit ball determined by $p_U$ is equal to $[-u, u];$ that is, $[-u, u] = \left\{ x \in X : p_U(x) \leq 1 \right\}.$

== Bibliography ==
- Narici, Lawrence; Beckenstein, Edward (2011). Topological Vector Spaces. Pure and applied mathematics (Second ed.). Boca Raton, FL: CRC Press. ISBN 978-1584888666. OCLC 144216834.
- Schaefer, Helmut H.; Wolff, Manfred P. (1999). Topological Vector Spaces. GTM. Vol. 8 (Second ed.). New York, NY: Springer New York Imprint Springer. ISBN 978-1-4612-7155-0. OCLC 840278135.
