= Ordered vector space =

Vector space with a partial order

A point $x$ in $\Reals^2$ and the set of all $y$ such that $x \leq y$ (in red). The order here is $x \leq y$ if and only if $x_1 \leq y_1$ and $x_2 \leq y_2.$

In mathematics, an ordered vector space or partially ordered vector space is a real vector space equipped with a partial order that is compatible with the vector space operations.

== Definition ==
Given a vector space $X$ over the real numbers $\Reals$ and a preorder $\,\leq\,$ on the set $X,$ the pair $(X, \leq)$ is called a preordered vector space and we say that the preorder $\,\leq\,$ is compatible with the vector space structure of $X$ and call $\,\leq\,$ a vector preorder on $X$ if for all $x, y, z \in X$ and $r \in \Reals$ with $r \geq 0$ the following two axioms are satisfied

1. $x \leq y$ implies $x + z \leq y + z,$
2. $y \leq x$ implies $r y \leq r x.$

If $\,\leq\,$ is a partial order compatible with the vector space structure of $X$ then $(X, \leq)$ is called an ordered vector space and $\,\leq\,$ is called a vector partial order on $X.$ The two axioms imply that translations and positive homotheties are automorphisms of the order structure and the mapping $x \mapsto -x$ is an isomorphism to the dual order structure. Ordered vector spaces are ordered groups under their addition operation. Note that $x \leq y$ if and only if $-y \leq -x.$

== Positive cones and their equivalence to orderings ==
A subset $C$ of a vector space $X$ is called a cone if for all real $r > 0,$ $r C \subseteq C$. A cone is called pointed if it contains the origin. A cone $C$ is convex if and only if $C + C \subseteq C.$ The intersection of any non-empty family of cones (resp. convex cones) is again a cone (resp. convex cone); the same is true of the union of an increasing (under set inclusion) family of cones (resp. convex cones). A cone $C$ in a vector space $X$ is said to be generating if $X = C - C.$

Given a preordered vector space $X,$ the subset $X^+$ of all elements $x$ in $(X, \leq)$ satisfying $x \geq 0$ is a pointed convex cone (that is, a convex cone containing $0$) called the positive cone of $X$ and denoted by $\operatorname{PosCone} X.$ The elements of the positive cone are called positive. If $x$ and $y$ are elements of a preordered vector space $(X, \leq),$ then $x \leq y$ if and only if $y - x \in X^+.$ The positive cone is generating if and only if $X$ is a directed set under $\,\leq.$ Given any pointed convex cone $C$ one may define a preorder $\,\leq\,$ on $X$ that is compatible with the vector space structure of $X$ by declaring for all $x, y \in X,$ that $x \leq y$ if and only if $y - x \in C;$ the positive cone of this resulting preordered vector space is $C.$ There is thus a one-to-one correspondence between pointed convex cones and vector preorders on $X.$ If $X$ is preordered then we may form an equivalence relation on $X$ by defining $x$ is equivalent to $y$ if and only if $x \leq y$ and $y \leq x;$ if $N$ is the equivalence class containing the origin then $N$ is a vector subspace of $X$ and $X / N$ is an ordered vector space under the relation: $A \leq B$ if and only there exist $a \in A$ and $b \in B$ such that $a \leq b.$

A subset of $C$ of a vector space $X$ is called a proper cone if it is a convex cone satisfying $C \cap (- C) = \{0\}.$ Explicitly, $C$ is a proper cone if (1) $C + C \subseteq C,$ (2) $r C \subseteq C$ for all $r > 0,$ and (3) $C \cap (- C) = \{0\}.$ The intersection of any non-empty family of proper cones is again a proper cone. Each proper cone $C$ in a real vector space induces an order on the vector space by defining $x \leq y$ if and only if $y - x \in C,$ and furthermore, the positive cone of this ordered vector space will be $C.$ Therefore, there exists a one-to-one correspondence between the proper convex cones of $X$ and the vector partial orders on $X.$

By a total vector ordering on $X$ we mean a total order on $X$ that is compatible with the vector space structure of $X.$ The family of total vector orderings on a vector space $X$ is in one-to-one correspondence with the family of all proper cones that are maximal under set inclusion. A total vector ordering cannot be Archimedean if its dimension, when considered as a vector space over the reals, is greater than 1.

If $R$ and $S$ are two orderings of a vector space with positive cones $P$ and $Q,$ respectively, then we say that $R$ is finer than $S$ if $P \subseteq Q.$

== Intervals and the order bound dual ==
An order interval in a preordered vector space is a set of the form
$$\begin{alignat}{4}
[a, b] &= \{x : a \leq x \leq b\}, \\[0.1ex]
[a, b[ &= \{x : a \leq x <    b\}, \\
]a, b] &= \{x : a <    x \leq b\}, \text{ or } \\
]a, b[ &= \{x : a <    x <    b\}. \\
\end{alignat}$$
From axioms 1 and 2 above it follows that $x, y \in [a, b]$ and $0 < t < 1$ implies $t x + (1 - t) y$ belongs to $[a, b];$ thus these order intervals are convex. A subset is said to be order bounded if it is contained in some order interval. In a preordered real vector space, if for $x \geq 0$ then the interval of the form $[-x, x]$ is balanced. An order unit of a preordered vector space is any element $x$ such that the set $[-x, x]$ is absorbing.

The set of all linear functionals on a preordered vector space $X$ that map every order interval into a bounded set is called the order bound dual of $X$ and denoted by $X^{\operatorname{b}}.$ If a space is ordered then its order bound dual is a vector subspace of its algebraic dual.

A subset $A$ of an ordered vector space $X$ is called order complete if for every non-empty subset $B \subseteq A$ such that $B$ is order bounded in $A,$ both $\sup B$ and $\inf B$ exist and are elements of $A.$ We say that an ordered vector space $X$ is order complete is $X$ is an order complete subset of $X.$

=== Examples ===
If $(X, \leq)$ is a preordered vector space over the reals with order unit $u,$ then the map $p(x) := \inf \{t \in \Reals : x \leq t u\}$ is a sublinear functional.

== Properties ==
If $X$ is a preordered vector space then for all $x, y \in X,$

- $x \geq 0$ and $y \geq 0$ imply $x + y \geq 0.$
- $x \leq y$ if and only if $-y \leq -x.$
- $x \leq y$ and $r < 0$ imply $r x \geq r y.$
- $x \leq y$ if and only if $y = \sup \{x, y\}$ if and only if $x = \inf \{x, y\}$
- $\sup \{x, y\}$ exists if and only if $\inf \{-x, -y\}$ exists, in which case $\inf \{-x, -y\} = - \sup \{x, y\}.$
- $\sup \{x, y\}$ exists if and only if $\inf \{x, y\}$ exists, in which case for all $z \in X,$
  - $\sup \{x + z, y + z\} = z + \sup \{x, y\},$ and
  - $\inf \{x + z, y + z\} = z + \inf \{x, y\}$
  - $x + y = \inf\{x, y\} + \sup \{x, y\}.$
- $X$ is a vector lattice if and only if $\sup \{0, x\}$ exists for all $x \in X.$

== Spaces of linear maps ==
A cone $C$ is said to be generating if $C - C$ is equal to the whole vector space. If $X$ and $W$ are two non-trivial ordered vector spaces with respective positive cones $P$ and $Q,$ then $P$ is generating in $X$ if and only if the set $C = \{u \in L(X; W) : u(P) \subseteq Q\}$ is a proper cone in $L(X; W),$ which is the space of all linear maps from $X$ into $W.$ In this case, the ordering defined by $C$ is called the canonical ordering of $L(X; W).$ More generally, if $M$ is any vector subspace of $L(X; W)$ such that $C \cap M$ is a proper cone, the ordering defined by $C \cap M$ is called the canonical ordering of $M.$

=== Positive functionals and the order dual ===
A linear function $f$ on a preordered vector space is called positive if it satisfies either of the following equivalent conditions:

1. $x \geq 0$ implies $f(x) \geq 0.$
2. if $x \leq y$ then $f(x) \leq f(y).$

The set of all positive linear forms on a vector space with positive cone $C,$ called the dual cone and denoted by $C^*,$ is a cone equal to the polar of $-C.$ The preorder induced by the dual cone on the space of linear functionals on $X$ is called the dual preorder.

The order dual of an ordered vector space $X$ is the set, denoted by $X^+,$ defined by $X^+ := C^* - C^*.$ Although $X^+ \subseteq X^b,$ there do exist ordered vector spaces for which set equality does not hold.

== Special types of ordered vector spaces ==
Let $X$ be an ordered vector space. We say that an ordered vector space $X$ is Archimedean ordered and that the order of $X$ is Archimedean if whenever $x$ in $X$ is such that $\{n x : n \in \N\}$ is majorized (that is, there exists some $y \in X$ such that $n x \leq y$ for all $n \in \N$) then $x \leq 0.$ A topological vector space (TVS) that is an ordered vector space is necessarily Archimedean if its positive cone is closed.

We say that a preordered vector space $X$ is regularly ordered and that its order is regular if it is Archimedean ordered and $X^+$ distinguishes points in $X.$ This property guarantees that there are sufficiently many positive linear forms to be able to successfully use the tools of duality to study ordered vector spaces.

An ordered vector space is called a vector lattice if for all elements $x$ and $y,$ the supremum $\sup (x, y)$ and infimum $\inf (x, y)$ exist.

== Subspaces, quotients, and products ==
Throughout let $X$ be a preordered vector space with positive cone $C.$

Subspaces

If $M$ is a vector subspace of $X$ then the canonical ordering on $M$ induced by $X$'s positive cone $C$ is the partial order induced by the pointed convex cone $C \cap M,$ where this cone is proper if $C$ is proper.

Quotient space

Let $M$ be a vector subspace of an ordered vector space $X,$ $\pi : X \to X / M$ be the canonical projection, and let $\hat{C} := \pi(C).$ Then $\hat{C}$ is a cone in $X / M$ that induces a canonical preordering on the quotient space $X / M.$ If $\hat{C}$ is a proper cone in$X / M$ then $\hat{C}$ makes $X / M$ into an ordered vector space. If $M$ is $C$-saturated then $\hat{C}$ defines the canonical order of $X / M.$ Note that $X = \Reals^2_0$ provides an example of an ordered vector space where $\pi(C)$ is not a proper cone.

If $X$ is also a topological vector space (TVS) and if for each neighborhood $V$ of the origin in $X$ there exists a neighborhood $U$ of the origin such that $[(U + N) \cap C] \subseteq V + N$ then $\hat{C}$ is a normal cone for the quotient topology.

If $X$ is a topological vector lattice and $M$ is a closed solid sublattice of $X$ then $X / L$ is also a topological vector lattice.

Product

If $S$ is any set then the space $X^S$ of all functions from $S$ into $X$ is canonically ordered by the proper cone $\left\{f \in X^S : f(s) \in C \text{ for all } s \in S\right\}.$

Suppose that $\left\{X_\alpha : \alpha \in A\right\}$ is a family of preordered vector spaces and that the positive cone of $X_\alpha$ is $C_\alpha.$ Then $C := \prod_\alpha C_\alpha$ is a pointed convex cone in $\prod_\alpha X_\alpha,$ which determines a canonical ordering on $\prod_\alpha X_\alpha;$ $C$ is a proper cone if all $C_\alpha$ are proper cones.

Algebraic direct sum

The algebraic direct sum $\bigoplus_\alpha X_\alpha$ of $\left\{X_\alpha : \alpha \in A\right\}$ is a vector subspace of $\prod_\alpha X_\alpha$ that is given the canonical subspace ordering inherited from $\prod_\alpha X_\alpha.$ If $X_1, \dots, X_n$ are ordered vector subspaces of an ordered vector space $X$ then $X$ is the ordered direct sum of these subspaces if the canonical algebraic isomorphism of $X$ onto $\prod_\alpha X_\alpha$ (with the canonical product order) is an order isomorphism.

== Examples ==
- The real numbers with the usual ordering form a totally ordered vector space. For all integers $n \geq 0,$ the Euclidean space $\Reals^n$ considered as a vector space over the reals with the lexicographic ordering forms a preordered vector space whose order is Archimedean if and only if $n = 1$.
- $\Reals^2$ is an ordered vector space with the $\,\leq\,$ relation defined in any of the following ways (in order of increasing strength, that is, decreasing sets of pairs):
  - Lexicographical order: $(a, b) \leq (c, d)$ if and only if $a < c$ or $(a = c \text{ and } b \leq d).$ This is a total order. The positive cone is given by $x > 0$ or $(x = 0 \text{ and } y \geq 0),$ that is, in polar coordinates, the set of points with the angular coordinate satisfying $-\pi / 2 < \theta \leq \pi / 2,$ together with the origin.
  - $(a, b) \leq (c, d)$ if and only if $a \leq c$ and $b \leq d$ (the product order of two copies of $\Reals$ with $\leq$). This is a partial order. The positive cone is given by $x \geq 0$ and $y \geq 0,$ that is, in polar coordinates $0 \leq \theta \leq \pi / 2,$ together with the origin.
  - $(a, b) \leq (c, d)$ if and only if $(a < c \text{ and } b < d)$ or $(a = c \text{ and } b = d)$ (the reflexive closure of the direct product of two copies of $\Reals$ with "<"). This is also a partial order. The positive cone is given by $(x > 0 \text{ and } y > 0)$ or $x = y = 0),$ that is, in polar coordinates, $0 < \theta < \pi / 2,$ together with the origin.

Only the second order is, as a subset of $\Reals^4,$ closed; see partial orders in topological spaces.
For the third order the two-dimensional "intervals" $p < x < q$ are open sets which generate the topology.

- $\Reals^n$ is an ordered vector space with the $\,\leq\,$ relation defined similarly. For example, for the second order mentioned above:
  - $x \leq y$ if and only if $x_i \leq y_i$ for $i = 1, \dots, n.$
- A Riesz space is an ordered vector space where the order gives rise to a lattice.
- The space of continuous functions on $[0, 1]$ where $f \leq g$ if and only if $f(x) \leq g(x)$ for all $x$ in $[0, 1].$
- Let $\mbox{Sym}_n(\mathbb{R})$ denote the symmetric $n \times n$ matrices with real entries. The Loewner order $\preccurlyeq$ on two symmetric matrices $A,B \in \mbox{Sym}_n(\mathbb{R})$is defined by $A \preccurlyeq B \Leftrightarrow B - A$ is positive semi-definite. Its positive cone is, by definition, the set of all positive definite matrices. Furthermore, the spectral theorem applied to symmetric matrices establishes that this cone is generating.

=== Pointwise order ===
If $S$ is any set and if $X$ is a vector space (over the reals) of real-valued functions on $S,$ then the pointwise order on $X$ is given by, for all $f, g \in X,$ $f \leq g$ if and only if $f(s) \leq g(s)$ for all $s \in S.$

Spaces that are typically assigned this order include:

- the space $\ell^\infty(S, \Reals)$ of bounded real-valued maps on $S.$
- the space $c_0(\Reals)$ of real-valued sequences that converge to $0.$
- the space $C(S, \Reals)$ of continuous real-valued functions on a topological space $S.$
- for any non-negative integer $n,$ the Euclidean space $\Reals^n$ when considered as the space $C(\{1, \dots, n\}, \Reals)$ where $S = \{1, \dots, n\}$ is given the discrete topology.

The space $\mathcal{L}^\infty(\Reals, \Reals)$ of all measurable almost-everywhere bounded real-valued maps on $\Reals,$ where the preorder is defined for all $f, g \in \mathcal{L}^\infty(\Reals, \Reals)$ by $f \leq g$ if and only if $f(s) \leq g(s)$ almost everywhere.

== See also ==
- Order topology (functional analysis) – Topology of an ordered vector space
- Ordered field – Algebraic object with an ordered structure
- Ordered group – Group with a compatible partial order
- Ordered ring
- Ordered topological vector space
- Partially ordered space – Partially ordered topological space
- Product order – Construction in order theory
- Riesz space – Partially ordered vector space, ordered as a lattice
- Topological vector lattice
- Vector lattice – Partially ordered vector space, ordered as a lattice

== Bibliography ==
- Aliprantis, Charalambos D; Burkinshaw, Owen (2003). Locally solid Riesz spaces with applications to economics (Second ed.). Providence, R. I.: American Mathematical Society. ISBN 0-8218-3408-8.
- Bourbaki, Nicolas; Elements of Mathematics: Topological Vector Spaces; ISBN 0-387-13627-4.
- Narici, Lawrence; Beckenstein, Edward (2011). Topological Vector Spaces. Pure and applied mathematics (Second ed.). Boca Raton, FL: CRC Press. ISBN 978-1584888666. OCLC 144216834.
- Schaefer, Helmut H.; Wolff, Manfred P. (1999). Topological Vector Spaces. GTM. Vol. 8 (Second ed.). New York, NY: Springer New York Imprint Springer. ISBN 978-1-4612-7155-0. OCLC 840278135.
- Wong (1979). Schwartz spaces, nuclear spaces, and tensor products. Berlin New York: Springer-Verlag. ISBN 3-540-09513-6. OCLC 5126158.
