= Partially ordered group =

Group with a compatible partial order

In abstract algebra, a partially ordered group is a group (G, +) equipped with a partial order "≤" that is translation-invariant; in other words, "≤" has the property that, for all a, b, and g in G, if a ≤ b then a + g ≤ b + g and g + a ≤ g + b.

An element x of G is called positive if 0 ≤ x. The set of elements 0 ≤ x is often denoted with G^{+}, and is called the positive cone of G.

By translation invariance, we have a ≤ b if and only if 0 ≤ -a + b. So we can reduce the partial order to a monadic property: a ≤ b if and only if -a + b ∈ G^{+}.

For the general group G, the existence of a positive cone specifies an order on G. A group G is a partially orderable group if and only if there exists a subset H (which is G^{+}) of G such that:

- 0 ∈ H
- if a ∈ H and b ∈ H then a + b ∈ H
- if a ∈ H then -x + a + x ∈ H for each x of G
- if a ∈ H and -a ∈ H then a = 0

A partially ordered group G with positive cone G^{+} is said to be unperforated if n · g ∈ G^{+} for some positive integer n implies g ∈ G^{+}. Being unperforated means there is no "gap" in the positive cone G^{+}.

If the order on the group is a linear order, then it is said to be a linearly ordered group. If the order on the group is a lattice order, i.e. any two elements have a least upper bound, then it is a lattice-ordered group (shortly l-group, though usually typeset with a script l: ℓ-group).

By Holland's embedding theorem, a representation theorem of Wilbur Charles Holland from 1963, every lattice-ordered group embeds, with its lattice operations preserved, into the lattice-ordered group of order-preserving bijections of a chain.

A Riesz group is an unperforated partially ordered group with a property slightly weaker than being a lattice-ordered group. Namely, a Riesz group satisfies the Riesz interpolation property: if x_{1}, x_{2}, y_{1}, y_{2} are elements of G and x_{i} ≤ y_{j}, then there exists z ∈ G such that x_{i} ≤ z ≤ y_{j}.

If G and H are two partially ordered groups, a map from G to H is a morphism of partially ordered groups if it is both a group homomorphism and a monotonic function. The partially ordered groups, together with this notion of morphism, form a category.

== Examples ==
- The integers with their usual order
- An ordered vector space is a partially ordered group
- A Riesz space is a lattice-ordered group
- A typical example of a partially ordered group is Z^{n}, where the group operation is componentwise addition, and we write (a_{1},...,a_{n}) ≤ (b_{1},...,b_{n}) if and only if a_{i} ≤ b_{i} (in the usual order of integers) for all i = 1,..., n.
- More generally, if G is a partially ordered group and X is some set, then the set of all functions from X to G is again a partially ordered group: all operations are performed componentwise. Furthermore, every subgroup of G is a partially ordered group: it inherits the order from G.
- If A is an approximately finite-dimensional C*-algebra, or more generally, if A is a stably finite unital C*-algebra, then K_{0}(A) is a partially ordered abelian group. (Elliott, 1976)

== Properties ==
=== Archimedean ===
In the lattice-ordered group of order-preserving bijections of the real line, a bump b supported in [a, c] satisfies e < b and b^{n} < t_{d} for every n, where t_{d} is translation by d ≥ c − a; so this group is not Archimedean.

The Archimedean property of the real numbers can be generalized to partially ordered groups.

Property: A partially ordered group $G$ is called Archimedean when for any $a, b \in G$, if $e \le a \le b$ and $a^n \le b$ for all $n \ge 1$ then $a=e$. Equivalently, when $a \neq e$, then for any $b \in G$, there is some $n\in \mathbb{Z}$ such that $b < a^n$.

=== Integrally closed ===
A partially ordered group G is called integrally closed if for all elements a and b of G, if a^{n} ≤ b for all natural n then a ≤ 1.

This property is somewhat stronger than the fact that a partially ordered group is Archimedean, though for a lattice-ordered group to be integrally closed and to be Archimedean is equivalent. There is a theorem that every integrally closed directed group is already abelian. This has to do with the fact that a directed group is embeddable into a complete lattice-ordered group if and only if it is integrally closed.

== See also ==
- Cyclically ordered group – Group with a cyclic order respected by the group operation
- Linearly ordered group – Group with translationally invariant total order
- Ordered field – Algebraic object with an ordered structure
- Ordered ring
- Ordered topological vector space
- Ordered vector space – Vector space with a partial order
- Partially ordered ring – Ring with a compatible partial order
- Partially ordered space – Partially ordered topological space
