= Order complete =

Property of subsets of ordered vector spaces

In mathematics, specifically in order theory and functional analysis, a subset $A$ of an ordered vector space is said to be order complete in $X$ if for every non-empty subset $S$ of $X$ that is order bounded in $A$ (meaning contained in an interval, which is a set of the form $[a, b] := \{ x \in X : a \leq x \text{ and } x \leq b \},$ for some $a, b \in A$), the supremum $\sup S$ and the infimum $\inf S$ both exist and are elements of $A.$ An ordered vector space is called order complete, Dedekind complete, a complete vector lattice, or a complete Riesz space, if it is order complete as a subset of itself, in which case it is necessarily a vector lattice. An ordered vector space is said to be countably order complete if each countable subset that is bounded above has a supremum.

Being an order complete vector space is an important property that is used frequently in the theory of topological vector lattices.

== Examples ==
The order dual of a vector lattice is an order complete vector lattice under its canonical ordering.

If $X$ is a locally convex topological vector lattice then the strong dual $X^{\prime}_b$ is an order complete locally convex topological vector lattice under its canonical order.

Every reflexive locally convex topological vector lattice is order complete and a complete TVS.

== Properties ==
If $X$ is an order complete vector lattice then for any subset $A \subseteq X,$ $X$ is the ordered direct sum of the band generated by $A$ and of the band $A^{\perp}$ of all elements that are disjoint from $A.$ For any subset $A$ of $X,$ the band generated by $A$ is $A^{\perp \perp}.$ If $x$ and $y$ are lattice disjoint then the band generated by $\{x\},$ contains $y$ and is lattice disjoint from the band generated by $\{y\},$ which contains $x.$

== See also ==
- Vector lattice – Partially ordered vector space, ordered as a lattice

== Bibliography ==
- Narici, Lawrence; Beckenstein, Edward (2011). Topological Vector Spaces. Pure and applied mathematics (Second ed.). Boca Raton, FL: CRC Press. ISBN 978-1584888666. OCLC 144216834.
- Schaefer, Helmut H.; Wolff, Manfred P. (1999). Topological Vector Spaces. GTM. Vol. 8 (Second ed.). New York, NY: Springer New York Imprint Springer. ISBN 978-1-4612-7155-0. OCLC 840278135.
