= Solid set =

In mathematics, specifically in order theory and functional analysis, a subset $S$ of a vector lattice $X$ is said to be solid and is called an ideal if for all $s \in S$ and $x \in X,$ if $|x| \leq |s|$ then $x \in S.$ An ordered vector space whose order is Archimedean is said to be Archimedean ordered. If $S\subseteq X$ then the ideal generated by $S$ is the smallest ideal in $X$ containing $S.$ An ideal generated by a singleton set is called a principal ideal in $X.$

== Examples ==
The intersection of an arbitrary collection of ideals in $X$ is again an ideal and furthermore, $X$ is clearly an ideal of itself. thus every subset of $X$ is contained in a unique smallest ideal.

In a locally convex vector lattice $X,$ the polar of every solid neighborhood of the origin is a solid subset of the continuous dual space $X^{\prime}$; moreover, the family of all solid equicontinuous subsets of $X^{\prime}$ is a fundamental family of equicontinuous sets, the polars (in bidual $X^{\prime\prime}$) form a neighborhood base of the origin for the natural topology on $X^{\prime\prime}$ (that is, the topology of uniform convergence on equicontinuous subsets of $X^{\prime}$).

== Properties ==
- A solid subspace of a vector lattice $X$ is necessarily a sublattice of $X.$
- If $N$ is a solid subspace of a vector lattice $X$ then the quotient $X/N$ is a vector lattice (under the canonical order).

== See also ==
- Vector lattice – Partially ordered vector space, ordered as a lattice
