= Partially ordered space =

Partially ordered topological space

In mathematics, a partially ordered space (or pospace) is a topological space $X$ equipped with a closed partial order $\leq$, i.e. a partial order whose graph $\{(x, y) \in X^2 \mid x \leq y\}$ is a closed subset of $X^2$.

From pospaces, one can define dimaps, i.e. continuous maps between pospaces which preserve the order relation.

== Equivalences ==
For a topological space $X$ equipped with a partial order $\leq$, the following are equivalent:

- $X$ is a partially ordered space.
- For all $x,y\in X$ with $x \not\leq y$, there are open sets $U,V\subset X$ with $x\in U, y\in V$ and $u \not\leq v$ for all $u\in U, v\in V$.
- For all $x,y\in X$ with $x \not\leq y$, there are disjoint neighbourhoods $U$ of $x$ and $V$ of $y$ such that $U$ is an upper set and $V$ is a lower set.

The order topology is a special case of this definition, since a total order is also a partial order.

== Properties ==
Every pospace is a Hausdorff space. If we take equality $=$ as the partial order, this definition becomes the definition of a Hausdorff space.

Since the graph is closed, if $\left( x_{\alpha} \right)_{\alpha \in A}$ and $\left( y_{\alpha} \right)_{\alpha \in A}$ are nets converging to x and y, respectively, such that $x_{\alpha} \leq y_{\alpha}$ for all $\alpha$, then $x \leq y$.

== See also ==
- Ordered vector space – Vector space with a partial order
- Ordered topological vector space
- Topological vector lattice
