= Archimedean property =

Mathematical property of algebraic structures

Illustration of the Archimedean property.

In abstract algebra and analysis, the Archimedean property, named after the ancient Greek mathematician Archimedes of Syracuse, is a property held by some algebraic structures, such as ordered or normed groups, and fields. The property, as typically construed, states that given two positive numbers $x$ and $y$, there is a positive integer $n$ such that $nx > y$. The fact that the set of natural numbers satisfies the Archimedean property implies that the set of natural numbers is not bounded above. Roughly speaking, it is the property of having no infinitely large or infinitely small elements. It was Otto Stolz who gave the axiom of Archimedes its name because it appears as Axiom V of Archimedes’ On the Sphere and Cylinder.

The notion arose from the theory of magnitudes of ancient Greece; it still plays an important role in modern mathematics such as David Hilbert's axioms for geometry, and the theories of ordered groups, ordered fields, and local fields.

An algebraic structure in which any two non-zero elements are comparable, in the sense that neither of them is infinitesimal with respect to the other, is said to be Archimedean. A structure which has a pair of non-zero elements, one of which is infinitesimal with respect to the other, is said to be non-Archimedean. For example, a linearly ordered group that is Archimedean is an Archimedean group.

This can be made precise in various contexts with slightly different formulations. For example, in the context of ordered fields, one has the axiom of Archimedes which formulates this property, where the field of real numbers is Archimedean, but that of rational functions in real coefficients is not.

== History and origin of the name of the Archimedean property ==
The concept was named by Otto Stolz (in the 1880s) after the ancient Greek geometer and physicist Archimedes of Syracuse.

The Archimedean property appears in Book V of Euclid's Elements as Definition 4:

Magnitudes are said to have a ratio to one another which can, when multiplied, exceed one another.

Because Archimedes credited it to Eudoxus of Cnidus it is also known as the "Theorem of Eudoxus" or the Eudoxus axiom.

Archimedes used infinitesimals in heuristic arguments, although he denied that those were finished mathematical proofs.

== Definition for linearly ordered groups ==
Let x and y be positive elements of a linearly ordered group G. Then $x$ is infinitesimal with respect to $y$ (or equivalently, $y$ is infinite with respect to $x$) if, for any natural number $n$, the multiple $nx$ is less than $y$, that is, the following inequality holds:
$$\underbrace{x+\cdots+x}_{n\text{ terms}} < y. \,$$

This definition can be extended to the entire group by taking absolute values.

The group $G$ is Archimedean if there is no pair $(x,y)$ such that $x$ is infinitesimal with respect to $y$.

Additionally, if $K$ is an algebraic structure with a unit (1)—for example, a ring—a similar definition applies to $K$. If $x$ is infinitesimal with respect to $1$, then $x$ is an infinitesimal element. Likewise, if $y$ is infinite with respect to $1$, then $y$ is an infinite element. The algebraic structure $K$ is Archimedean if it has no infinite elements and no infinitesimal elements.

=== Ordered fields ===
Ordered fields have some additional properties:

- The rational numbers are embedded in any ordered field. That is, any ordered field has characteristic zero.
- If $x$ is infinitesimal, then $1/x$ is infinite, and vice versa. Therefore, to verify that a field is Archimedean it is enough to check only that there are no infinitesimal elements, or to check that there are no infinite elements.
- If $x$ is infinitesimal and $r$ is a rational number, then $rx$ is also infinitesimal. As a result, given a general element $c$, the three numbers $c/2$, $c$, and $2c$ are either all infinitesimal or all non-infinitesimal.

In this setting, an ordered field K is Archimedean precisely when the following statement, called the axiom of Archimedes, holds:

Let $x$ be any element of $K$. Then there exists a natural number $n$ such that $n > x$.

Alternatively one can use the following characterization:
$$\forall\, \varepsilon \in K\big(\varepsilon > 0 \implies \exists\ n \in N : 1/n < \varepsilon\big).$$

== Definition for normed fields ==
The qualifier "Archimedean" is also formulated in the theory of rank one valued fields and normed spaces over rank one valued fields as follows. Let $K$ be a field endowed with an absolute value function, i.e., a function which associates the real number $0$ with the field element 0 and associates a positive real number $|x|$ with each non-zero $x \in K$ and satisfies $|xy|=|x| |y|$ and $|x+y| \le |x|+|y|$. Then, $K$ is said to be Archimedean if for any non-zero $x \in K$ there exists a natural number $n$ such that
$$|\underbrace{x+\cdots+x}_{n\text{ terms}}| > 1.$$

Similarly, a normed space is Archimedean if a sum of $n$ terms, each equal to a non-zero vector $x$, has norm greater than one for sufficiently large $n$. A field with an absolute value or a normed space is either Archimedean or satisfies the stronger condition, referred to as the ultrametric triangle inequality,
$$|x+y| \le \max(|x|,|y|) ,$$
respectively. A field or normed space satisfying the ultrametric triangle inequality is called non-Archimedean.

The concept of a non-Archimedean normed linear space was introduced by A. F. Monna.

== Examples and non-examples ==
=== Archimedean property of the real numbers ===
The field of the rational numbers admits various absolute value functions, including the trivial function $|x|=1$, when $x \neq 0$, the more usual $|x| = \sqrt{x^2}$, and the $p$-adic absolute value functions. By Ostrowski's theorem, every non-trivial absolute value on the rational numbers is equivalent to either the usual absolute value or some $p$-adic absolute value. The rational field is not complete with respect to non-trivial absolute values; with respect to the trivial absolute value, the rational field is a discrete topological space, so complete. The completion with respect to the usual absolute value (from the order) is the field of real numbers. By this construction, the field of real numbers is Archimedean both as an ordered field and as a normed field. On the other hand, the completions with respect to the other non-trivial absolute values give the fields of p-adic numbers, where $p$ is a prime integer number (see below); since the $p$-adic absolute values satisfy the ultrametric property, then the $p$-adic number fields are non-Archimedean as normed fields (they cannot be made into ordered fields).

In the axiomatic theory of real numbers, the non-existence of nonzero infinitesimal real numbers is implied by the least upper bound property as follows: Denote by $Z$ the set consisting of all positive infinitesimals. This set is bounded above by $1$. Now assume for a contradiction that $Z$ is nonempty. Then it has a least upper bound $c$, which is also positive, so $c/2 < c < 2c$. Since c is an upper bound of $Z$ and $2c$ is strictly larger than $c$, $2c$ is not a positive infinitesimal. That is, there is some natural number $n$ for which $1/n < 2c$. On the other hand, $c/2$ is a positive infinitesimal, since by the definition of least upper bound there must be an infinitesimal $x$ between $c/2$ and $c$, and if $1/k < c/2 \leq x$ then $x$ is not infinitesimal. But $1/(4n) < c/2$, so $c/2$ is not infinitesimal, and this is a contradiction. This means that $Z$ is empty after all: there are no positive, infinitesimal real numbers.

The Archimedean property of real numbers holds also in constructive analysis, even though the least upper bound property may fail in that context.

=== Non-Archimedean ordered field ===
For an example of an ordered field that is not Archimedean, take the field of rational functions with real coefficients. (A rational function is any function that can be expressed as one polynomial divided by another polynomial; we will assume in what follows that this has been done in such a way that the leading coefficient of the denominator is positive.) To make this an ordered field, one must assign an ordering compatible with the addition and multiplication operations. Now $f > g$ if and only if $f - g > 0$, so we only have to say which rational functions are considered positive. Call the function positive if the leading coefficient of the numerator is positive. (One must check that this ordering is well defined and compatible with addition and multiplication.) By this definition, the rational function $1/x$ is positive but less than the rational function $1$. In fact, if $n$ is any natural number, then $n(1/x) = n/x$ is positive but still less than $1$, no matter how big $n$ is. Therefore, $1/x$ is an infinitesimal in this field.

This example generalizes to other coefficients. Taking rational functions with rational instead of real coefficients produces a countable non-Archimedean ordered field. Taking the coefficients to be the rational functions in a different variable, say $y$, produces an example with a different order type.

=== Non-Archimedean valued fields ===
The field of the rational numbers endowed with the p-adic metric and the p-adic number fields which are the completions, do not have the Archimedean property as fields with absolute values. All Archimedean valued fields are isometrically isomorphic to a subfield of the complex numbers with a power of the usual absolute value.

=== Equivalent definitions of Archimedean ordered field ===
Every linearly ordered field $K$ contains (an isomorphic copy of) the rationals as an ordered subfield, namely the subfield generated by the multiplicative unit $1$ of $K$, which in turn contains the integers as an ordered subgroup, which contains the natural numbers as an ordered monoid. The embedding of the rationals then gives a way of speaking about the rationals, integers, and natural numbers in $K$. The following are equivalent characterizations of Archimedean fields in terms of these substructures.

1. The natural numbers are cofinal in $K$. That is, every element of $K$ is less than some natural number. (This is not the case when there exist infinite elements.) Thus an Archimedean field is one whose natural numbers grow without bound.
2. Zero is the infimum in $K$ of the set $\{1/2, 1/3, 1/4, \dots\}$. (If $K$ contained a positive infinitesimal it would be a lower bound for the set whence zero would not be the greatest lower bound.)
3. The set of elements of $K$ between the positive and negative rationals is non-open. This is because the set consists of all the infinitesimals, which is just the set $\{0\}$ when there are no nonzero infinitesimals, and otherwise is open, there being neither a least nor greatest nonzero infinitesimal. Observe that in both cases, the set of infinitesimals is closed. In the latter case, (i) every infinitesimal is less than every positive rational, (ii) there is neither a greatest infinitesimal nor a least positive rational, and (iii) there is nothing else in between. Consequently, any non-Archimedean ordered field is both incomplete and disconnected.
4. For any $x$ in $K$ the set of integers greater than $x$ has a least element. (If $x$ were a negative infinite quantity every integer would be greater than it.)
5. Every nonempty open interval of $K$ contains a rational. (If $x$ is a positive infinitesimal, the open interval $(x,2x)$ contains infinitely many infinitesimals but not a single rational.)
6. The rationals are dense in $K$ with respect to both sup and inf. (That is, every element of $K$ is the sup of some set of rationals, and the inf of some other set of rationals.) Thus an Archimedean field is any dense ordered extension of the rationals, in the sense of any ordered field that densely embeds its rational elements.

== See also ==
- 0.999... – Alternative decimal expansion of 1
- Archimedean ordered vector space – Vector space with a binary relation
- Construction of the real numbers
