= Ordered topological vector space =

In mathematics, specifically in functional analysis and order theory, an ordered topological vector space, also called an ordered TVS, is a topological vector space (TVS) X that has a partial order ≤ making it into an ordered vector space whose positive cone $C := \left\{ x \in X : x \geq 0\right\}$ is a closed subset of X. Ordered TVSes have important applications in spectral theory.

== Normal cone ==
If C is a cone in a TVS X then C is normal if $\mathcal{U} = \left[ \mathcal{U} \right]_{C}$, where $\mathcal{U}$ is the neighborhood filter at the origin, $\left[ \mathcal{U} \right]_{C} = \left\{ \left[ U \right] : U \in \mathcal{U} \right\}$, and $[U]_{C} := \left(U + C\right) \cap \left(U - C\right)$ is the C-saturated hull of a subset U of X.

If C is a cone in a TVS X (over the real or complex numbers), then the following are equivalent:

1. C is a normal cone.
2. For every filter $\mathcal{F}$ in X, if $\lim \mathcal{F} = 0$ then $\lim \left[ \mathcal{F} \right]_{C} = 0$.
3. There exists a neighborhood base $\mathcal{B}$ in X such that $B \in \mathcal{B}$ implies $\left[ B \cap C \right]_{C} \subseteq B$.

and if X is a vector space over the reals then also:

1. There exists a neighborhood base at the origin consisting of convex, balanced, C-saturated sets.
2. There exists a generating family $\mathcal{P}$ of semi-norms on X such that $p(x) \leq p(x + y)$ for all $x, y \in C$ and $p \in \mathcal{P}$.

If the topology on X is locally convex then the closure of a normal cone is a normal cone.

=== Properties ===
If C is a normal cone in X and B is a bounded subset of X then $\left[ B \right]_{C}$ is bounded; in particular, every interval $[a, b]$ is bounded. If X is Hausdorff then every normal cone in X is a proper cone.

== Properties ==
- Let X be an ordered vector space over the reals that is finite-dimensional. Then the order of X is Archimedean if and only if the positive cone of X is closed for the unique topology under which X is a Hausdorff TVS.
- Let X be an ordered vector space over the reals with positive cone C. Then the following are equivalent:
1. the order of X is regular.
2. C is sequentially closed for some Hausdorff locally convex TVS topology on X and $X^{+}$ distinguishes points in X
3. the order of X is Archimedean and C is normal for some Hausdorff locally convex TVS topology on X.

== See also ==
- Generalised metric – Metric geometry
- Order topology (functional analysis) – Topology of an ordered vector space
- Ordered field – Algebraic object with an ordered structure
- Ordered group – Group with a compatible partial order
- Ordered ring – ring with a compatible total order
- Ordered vector space – Vector space with a partial order
- Partially ordered space – Partially ordered topological space
- Riesz space – Partially ordered vector space, ordered as a lattice
- Topological vector lattice
