= Riesz space =

Partially ordered vector space, ordered as a lattice

In mathematics, a Riesz space, lattice-ordered vector space or vector lattice is a partially ordered vector space where the order structure is a lattice.

Riesz spaces are named after Frigyes Riesz who first defined them in his 1928 paper Sur la décomposition des opérations fonctionelles linéaires.

Riesz spaces have wide-ranging applications. They are important in measure theory, in that important results are special cases of results for Riesz spaces. For example, the Radon–Nikodym theorem follows as a special case of the Freudenthal spectral theorem. Riesz spaces have also seen application in mathematical economics through the work of Greek-American economist and mathematician Charalambos D. Aliprantis.

== Definition ==
=== Preliminaries ===
If $X$ is an ordered vector space (which by definition is a vector space over the reals) and if $S$ is a subset of $X$ then an element $b \in X$ is an upper bound (resp. lower bound) of $S$ if $s \leq b$ (resp. $s \geq b$) for all $s \in S.$ An element $a$ in $X$ is the least upper bound or supremum (resp. greater lower bound or infimum) of $S$ if it is an upper bound (resp. a lower bound) of $S$ and if for any upper bound (resp. any lower bound) $b$ of $S,$ $a \leq b$ (resp. $a \geq b$).

=== Preordered vector lattice ===
A preordered vector lattice is a preordered vector space $E$ in which every pair of elements has a supremum.

More explicitly, a preordered vector lattice is vector space endowed with a preorder, $\,\leq,\,$ such that for any $x, y, z \in E$:

1. Translation Invariance: $x \leq y$ implies $x + z \leq y + z.$
2. Positive Homogeneity: For any scalar $0 \leq a,$ $x \leq y$ implies $a x \leq a y.$
3. For any pair of vectors $x, y \in E,$ there exists a supremum (denoted $x \vee y$) in $E$ with respect to the order $\,(\leq).\,$

The preorder, together with items 1 and 2, which make it "compatible with the vector space structure", make $E$ a preordered vector space. Item 3 says that the preorder is a join semilattice. Because the preorder is compatible with the vector space structure, one can show that any pair also have an infimum, making $E$ also a meet semilattice, hence a lattice.

A preordered vector space $E$ is a preordered vector lattice if and only if it satisfies any of the following equivalent properties:

1. For any $x, y \in E,$ their supremum exists in $E.$
2. For any $x, y \in E,$ their infimum exists in $E.$
3. For any $x, y \in E,$ their infimum and their supremum exist in $E.$
4. For any $x \in E,$ $\sup \{x, 0\}$ exists in $E.$

=== Riesz space and vector lattices ===
A Riesz space or a vector lattice is a preordered vector lattice whose preorder is a partial order. Equivalently, it is an ordered vector space for which the ordering is a lattice.

Note that many authors required that a vector lattice be a partially ordered vector space (rather than merely a preordered vector space) while others only require that it be a preordered vector space. We will henceforth assume that every Riesz space and every vector lattice is an ordered vector space but that a preordered vector lattice is not necessarily partially ordered.

If $E$ is an ordered vector space over $\R$ whose positive cone $C$ (the elements $\,\geq 0$) is generating (that is, such that $E = C - C$), and if for every $x, y \in C$ either $\sup\{x, y\}$ or $\inf \{x, y\}$ exists, then $E$ is a vector lattice.

=== Intervals ===
An order interval in a partially ordered vector space is a convex set of the form $[a, b] = \{ x : a \leq x \leq b \}.$ In an ordered real vector space, every interval of the form $[-x, x]$ is balanced. From axioms 1 and 2 above it follows that $x, y \in [a, b]$ and $t \in (0, 1)$ implies $t x (1 - t) y \in [a, b].$ A subset is said to be order bounded if it is contained in some order interval. An order unit of a preordered vector space is any element $x$ such that the set $[-x, x]$ is absorbing.

The set of all linear functionals on a preordered vector space $V$ that map every order interval into a bounded set is called the order bound dual of $V$ and denoted by $V^b.$ If a space is ordered then its order bound dual is a vector subspace of its algebraic dual.

A subset $A$ of a vector lattice $E$ is called order complete if for every non-empty subset $B \subseteq A$ such that $B$ is order bounded in $A,$ both $\sup B$ and $\inf B$ exist and are elements of $A.$ We say that a vector lattice $E$ is order complete if $E$ is an order complete subset of $E.$

== Classification ==
Finite-dimensional Riesz spaces are entirely classified by the Archimedean property:

Theorem: Suppose that $X$ is a vector lattice of finite-dimension $n.$ If $X$ is Archimedean ordered then it is (a vector lattice) isomorphic to $\R^{n}$ under its canonical order. Otherwise, there exists an integer $k$ satisfying $2 \leq k \leq n$ such that $X$ is isomorphic to $\R^k_L \times \R^{n-k}$ where $\R^{n-k}$ has its canonical order, $\R^k_L$ is $\R^k$ with the lexicographical order, and the product of these two spaces has the canonical product order.

The same result does not hold in infinite dimensions. For an example due to Kaplansky, consider the vector space V of functions on [0,1] that are continuous except at finitely many points, where they have a pole of second order. This space is lattice-ordered by the usual pointwise comparison, but cannot be written as ℝ^{κ} for any cardinal κ. On the other hand, epi-mono factorization in the category of ℝ-vector spaces also applies to Riesz spaces: every lattice-ordered vector space injects into a quotient of ℝ^{κ} by a solid subspace.

== Basic properties ==
Every Riesz space is a partially ordered vector space, but not every partially ordered vector space is a Riesz space.

Note that for any subset $A$ of $X,$ $\sup A = - \inf (-A)$ whenever either the supremum or infimum exists (in which case they both exist). If $x \geq 0$ and $y \geq 0$ then $[0, x] + [0, y] = [0, x + y].$ For all $a, b, x, \text{ and } y$ in a Riesz space $X,$ $a - \inf (x, y) + b = \sup (a - x + b, a - y + b).$

=== Absolute value ===
For every element $x$ in a Riesz space $X,$ the absolute value of $x,$ denoted by $|x|,$ is defined to be $| x|:= \sup \{x, -x\},$ where this satisfies $-|x| \leq x \leq |x|$ and $|x| \geq 0.$ For any $x, y \in X$ and any real number $r,$ we have $|r x| = |r| |x|$ and $|x + y| \leq |x| + |y|.$

=== Disjointness ===
Two elements $x \text{ and } y$ in a vector lattice $X$ are said to be lattice disjoint or disjoint if $\inf \{|x|, |y|\} = 0,$ in which case we write $x \perp y.$ Two elements $x \text{ and } y$ are disjoint if and only if $\sup\{|x|, |y|\} = |x| + |y|.$ If $x \text{ and } y$ are disjoint then $| x + y|=|x|+|y |$ and $(x + y)^+ = x^+ + y^+,$ where for any element $z,$ $z^+ := \sup \{z, 0\}$ and $z^- := \sup \{-z, 0\}.$ We say that two sets $A$ and $B$ are disjoint if $a$ and $b$ are disjoint for all $a \in A$ and all $b \in B,$ in which case we write $A \perp B.$ If $A$ is the singleton set $\{ a \}$ then we will write $a \perp B$ in place of $\{a\} \perp B.$ For any set $A,$ we define the disjoint complement to be the set $A^{\perp} := \left\{ x \in X : x \perp A \right\}.$ Disjoint complements are always bands, but the converse is not true in general. If $A$ is a subset of $X$ such that $x = \sup A$ exists, and if $B$ is a subset lattice in $X$ that is disjoint from $A,$ then $B$ is a lattice disjoint from $\{x\}.$

=== Representation as a disjoint sum of positive elements ===
For any $x \in X,$ let $x^+ := \sup \{x, 0\}$ and $x^- := \sup \{-x, 0\},$ where note that both of these elements are $\geq 0$ and $x = x^+ - x^-$ with $|x|= x^+ + x^-.$ Then $x^+$ and $x^{-}$ are disjoint, and $x = x^+ - x^-$ is the unique representation of $x$ as the difference of disjoint elements that are $\geq 0.$ For all $x, y \in X,$ $\left|x^+ - y^+\right| \leq|x - y|$ and $x + y = \sup \{x, y\} + \inf \{x, y\}.$ If $y \geq 0$ and $x \leq y$ then $x^+ \leq y.$ Moreover, $x \leq y$ if and only if $x^+ \leq y^+$ and $x^- \leq y^-.$

Every Riesz space is a distributive lattice; that is, it has the following equivalent (Note: The conditions are equivalent only when they apply to all triples in a lattice. There are elements in (for example) N_{5} that satisfy the first equation but not the second.) properties: for all $x, y, z \in X$

1. $x \wedge (y \vee z) = (x \wedge y) \vee (x \wedge z)$
2. $x \vee (y \wedge z) = (x \vee y) \wedge (x \vee z)$
3. $(x \wedge y) \vee (y \wedge z) \vee (z \wedge x) = (x \vee y) \wedge (y \vee z) \wedge (z \vee x).$
4. $x \wedge z = y \wedge z$ and $x \vee z = y \vee z$ always imply $x = y.$

Every Riesz space has the Riesz decomposition property.

== Order convergence ==
There are a number of meaningful non-equivalent ways to define convergence of sequences or nets with respect to the order structure of a Riesz space. A sequence $\left\{x_n\right\}$ in a Riesz space $E$ is said to converge monotonely if it is a monotone decreasing (resp. increasing) sequence and its infimum (supremum) $x$ exists in $E$ and denoted $x_n \downarrow x$ (resp. $x_n \uparrow x$).

A sequence $\left\{x_n\right\}$ in a Riesz space $E$ is said to converge in order to $x$ if there exists a monotone converging sequence $\left\{p_n\right\}$ in $E$ such that $\left|x_n - x\right| < p_n \downarrow 0.$

If $u$ is a positive element of a Riesz space $E$ then a sequence $\left\{ x_n \right\}$ in $E$ is said to converge u-uniformly to $x$ if for any $r > 0$ there exists an $N$ such that $\left|x_n - x\right| < r u$ for all $n > N.$

== Subspaces ==
The extra structure provided by these spaces provide for distinct kinds of Riesz subspaces. The collection of each kind structure in a Riesz space (for example, the collection of all ideals) forms a distributive lattice.

=== Sublattices ===
If $X$ is a vector lattice then a vector sublattice is a vector subspace $F$ of $X$ such that for all $x, y \in F,$ $\sup\{x, y\}$ belongs to $F$ (where this supremum is taken in $X$). It can happen that a subspace $F$ of $X$ is a vector lattice under its canonical order but is not a vector sublattice of $X.$

=== Ideals ===
A vector subspace $I$ of a Riesz space $E$ is called an ideal if it is solid, meaning if for $f \in I$ and $g \in E,$ $|g| \leq |f|$ implies that $g \in I.$ The intersection of an arbitrary collection of ideals is again an ideal, which allows for the definition of a smallest ideal containing some non-empty subset $A$ of $E,$ and is called the ideal generated by $A.$ An Ideal generated by a singleton is called a principal ideal.

=== Bands and σ-Ideals ===
A band $B$ in a Riesz space $E$ is defined to be an ideal with the extra property, that for any element $f \in E$ for which its absolute value $|f|$ is the supremum of an arbitrary subset of positive elements in $B,$ that $f$ is actually in $B.$ $\sigma$-Ideals are defined similarly, with the words 'arbitrary subset' replaced with 'countable subset'. Clearly every band is a $\sigma$-ideal, but the converse is not true in general.

The intersection of an arbitrary family of bands is again a band. As with ideals, for every non-empty subset $A$ of $E,$ there exists a smallest band containing that subset, called the band generated by $A.$ A band generated by a singleton is called a principal band.

=== Projection bands ===
A band $B$ in a Riesz space, is called a projection band, if $E = B \oplus B^{\bot},$ meaning every element $f \in E$ can be written uniquely as a sum of two elements, $f = u + v$ with $u \in B$ and $v \in B^{\bot}.$ There then also exists a positive linear idempotent, or projection, $P_B : E \to E,$ such that $P_B(f) = u.$

The collection of all projection bands in a Riesz space forms a Boolean algebra. Some spaces do not have non-trivial projection bands (for example, $C([0, 1])$), so this Boolean algebra may be trivial.

=== Completeness ===
A vector lattice is complete if every subset has both a supremum and an infimum.

A vector lattice is Dedekind complete if each set with an upper bound has a supremum and each set with a lower bound has an infimum.

An order complete, regularly ordered vector lattice whose canonical image in its order bidual is order complete is called minimal and is said to be of minimal type.

== Subspaces, quotients, and products ==
Sublattices

If $M$ is a vector subspace of a preordered vector space $X$ then the canonical ordering on $M$ induced by $X$'s positive cone $C$ is the preorder induced by the pointed convex cone $C \cap M,$ where this cone is proper if $C$ is proper (that is, if $C \cap (- C) = \varnothing$).

A sublattice of a vector lattice $X$ is a vector subspace $M$ of $X$ such that for all $x, y \in M,$ $\sup_{}{}_X (x, y)$ belongs to $X$ (importantly, note that this supremum is taken in $X$ and not in $M$). If $X = L^p([0, 1], \mu)$ with $0 < p < 1,$ then the 2-dimensional vector subspace $M$ of $X$ defined by all maps of the form $t \mapsto a t + b$ (where $a, b \in \R$) is a vector lattice under the induced order but is not a sublattice of $X.$ This despite $X$ being an order complete Archimedean ordered topological vector lattice. Furthermore, there exist vector a vector sublattice $N$ of this space $X$ such that $N \cap C$ has empty interior in $X$ but no positive linear functional on $N$ can be extended to a positive linear functional on $X.$

Quotient lattices

Let $M$ be a vector subspace of an ordered vector space $X$ having positive cone $C,$ let $\pi : X \to X / M$ be the canonical projection, and let $\hat{C} := \pi(C).$ Then $\hat{C}$ is a cone in $X / M$ that induces a canonical preordering on the quotient space $X / M.$ If $\hat{C}$ is a proper cone in $X / M$ then $\hat{C}$ makes $X / M$ into an ordered vector space. If $M$ is $C$-saturated then $\hat{C}$ defines the canonical order of $X / M.$ Note that $X=\R^2_{0}$ provides an example of an ordered vector space where $\pi(C)$ is not a proper cone.

If $X$ is a vector lattice and $N$ is a solid vector subspace of $X$ then $\hat{C}$ defines the canonical order of $X / M$ under which $L / M$ is a vector lattice and the canonical map $\pi : X \to X / M$ is a vector lattice homomorphism. Furthermore, if $X$ is order complete and $M$ is a band in $X$ then $X / M$ is isomorphic with $M^{\bot}.$ Also, if $M$ is solid then the order topology of $X / M$ is the quotient of the order topology on $X.$

If $X$ is a topological vector lattice and $M$ is a closed solid sublattice of $X$ then $X / L$ is also a topological vector lattice.

Product

If $S$ is any set then the space $X^S$ of all functions from $S$ into $X$ is canonically ordered by the proper cone $\left\{ f \in X^S : f(s) \in C \text{ for all } s \in S \right\}.$

Suppose that $\left\{ X_\alpha : \alpha \in A \right\}$ is a family of preordered vector spaces and that the positive cone of $X_\alpha$ is $C_\alpha.$ Then $C := \prod_{\alpha} C_\alpha$ is a pointed convex cone in $\prod_\alpha X_\alpha,$ which determines a canonical ordering on $\prod_\alpha X_\alpha$; $C$ is a proper cone if all $C_\alpha$ are proper cones.

Algebraic direct sum

The algebraic direct sum $\bigoplus_\alpha X_\alpha$ of $\left\{ X_\alpha : \alpha \in A \right\}$ is a vector subspace of $\prod_\alpha X_\alpha$ that is given the canonical subspace ordering inherited from $\prod_\alpha X_\alpha.$ If $X_1, \ldots, X_n$ are ordered vector subspaces of an ordered vector space $X$ then $X$ is the ordered direct sum of these subspaces if the canonical algebraic isomorphism of $X$ onto $\prod_\alpha X_{\alpha}$ (with the canonical product order) is an order isomorphism.

== Spaces of linear maps ==
A cone $C$ in a vector space $X$ is said to be generating if $C - C$ is equal to the whole vector space. If $X$ and $W$ are two non-trivial ordered vector spaces with respective positive cones $P$ and $Q,$ then $P$ is generating in $X$ if and only if the set $C = \{ u \in \operatorname{L}(X; W) : u(P) \subseteq Q \}$ is a proper cone in $\operatorname{L}(X; W),$ which is the space of all linear maps from $X$ into $W.$ In this case the ordering defined by $C$ is called the canonical ordering of $\operatorname{L}(X; W).$ More generally, if $M$ is any vector subspace of $\operatorname{L}(X; W)$ such that $C \cap M$ is a proper cone, the ordering defined by $C \cap M$ is called the canonical ordering of $M.$

A linear map $u : X \to Y$ between two preordered vector spaces $X$ and $Y$ with respective positive cones $C$ and $D$ is called positive if $u(C) \subseteq D.$ If $X$ and $Y$ are vector lattices with $Y$ order complete and if $H$ is the set of all positive linear maps from $X$ into $Y$ then the subspace $M := H - H$ of $\operatorname{L}(X; Y)$ is an order complete vector lattice under its canonical order; furthermore, $M$ contains exactly those linear maps that map order intervals of $X$ into order intervals of $Y.$

=== Positive functionals and the order dual ===
A linear function $f$ on a preordered vector space is called positive if $x \geq 0$ implies $f(x) \geq 0.$ The set of all positive linear forms on a vector space, denoted by $C^*,$ is a cone equal to the polar of $- C.$ The order dual of an ordered vector space $X$ is the set, denoted by $X^+,$ defined by $X^+ := C^* - C^*.$ Although $X^+ \subseteq X^b,$ there do exist ordered vector spaces for which set equality does not hold.

== Vector lattice homomorphism ==
Suppose that $X$ and $Y$ are preordered vector lattices with positive cones $C$ and $D$ and let $u : X \to Y$ be a map. Then $u$ is a preordered vector lattice homomorphism if $u$ is linear and if any one of the following equivalent conditions hold:

1. $u$ preserves the lattice operations
2. $u(\sup \{x, y\}) = \sup \{ u(x), u(y) \}$ for all $x, y \in X.$
3. $u(\inf \{x, y\}) = \inf \{ u(x), u(y) \}$ for all $x, y \in X.$
4. $u(|x|) = \sup \left\{ u\left(x^+\right), u\left(x^-\right) \right\}$ for all $x \in X.$
5. $0 = \inf \left\{ u\left(x^+\right), u\left(x^-\right) \right\}$ for all $x \in X.$
6. $u(C) = D$ and $u^{-1}(0)$ is a solid subset of $X.$

A pre-ordered vector lattice homomorphism that is bijective is a pre-ordered vector lattice isomorphism.

A pre-ordered vector lattice homomorphism between two Riesz spaces is called a vector lattice homomorphism; if it is also bijective, then it is called a vector lattice isomorphism.

If $u$ is a non-zero linear functional on a vector lattice $X$ with positive cone $C$ then the following are equivalent:

1. $u : X \to \R$ is a surjective vector lattice homomorphism.
2. $0 = \inf \left\{ u\left(x^+\right), u\left(x^-\right) \right\}$ for all $x \in X.$
3. $u \geq 0$ and $u^{-1}(0)$ is a solid hyperplane in $X.$
4. $u'$ generates an extreme ray of the cone $X^*$ in $X^*.$

An extreme ray of the cone $C$ is a set $\{ r x : r \geq 0 \}$ where $x \in C,$ $x$ is non-zero, and if $y \in C$ is such that $x - y \in C$ then $y = s x$ for some $s$ such that $0 \leq s \leq 1.$

A vector lattice homomorphism from $X$ into $Y$ is a topological homomorphism when $X$ and $Y$ are given their respective order topologies.

== Projection properties ==
There are numerous projection properties that Riesz spaces may have. A Riesz space is said to have the (principal) projection property if every (principal) band is a projection band.

The so-called main inclusion theorem relates the following additional properties to the (principal) projection property: A Riesz space is...

- Dedekind Complete (DC) if every nonempty set, bounded above, has a supremum;
- Super Dedekind Complete (SDC) if every nonempty set, bounded above, has a countable subset with identical supremum;
- Dedekind $\sigma$-complete if every countable nonempty set, bounded above, has a supremum; and
- Archimedean property if, for every pair of positive elements $x$ and $y$, whenever the inequality $n x \leq y$ holds for all integers $n$, $x = 0$.

Then these properties are related as follows. SDC implies DC; DC implies both Dedekind $\sigma$-completeness and the projection property; Both Dedekind $\sigma$-completeness and the projection property separately imply the principal projection property; and the principal projection property implies the Archimedean property.

None of the reverse implications hold, but Dedekind $\sigma$-completeness and the projection property together imply DC.

== Examples ==
- The space of continuous real valued functions with compact support on a topological space $X$ with the pointwise partial order defined by $f \leq g$ when $f(x) \leq g(x)$ for all $x \in X,$ is a Riesz space. It is Archimedean, but usually does not have the principal projection property unless $X$ satisfies further conditions (for example, being extremally disconnected).
- Any $L^p$ space with the (almost everywhere) pointwise partial order is a Dedekind complete Riesz space.
- The space $\R^2$ with the lexicographical order is a non-Archimedean Riesz space.

== Properties ==
- Riesz spaces are lattice ordered groups
- Every Riesz space is a distributive lattice

== See also ==
- Convex cone – Mathematical set closed under positive linear combinations
- Holland's embedding theorem – Theorem in lattice-ordered group theory
- Infimum and supremum – Greatest lower bound and least upper bound
- Ordered vector space – Vector space with a partial order
- Partially ordered space – Partially ordered topological space

== Bibliography ==
- Bourbaki, Nicolas; Elements of Mathematics: Integration. Chapters 1–6; ISBN 3-540-41129-1
- Narici, Lawrence; Beckenstein, Edward (2011). Topological Vector Spaces. Pure and applied mathematics (Second ed.). Boca Raton, FL: CRC Press. ISBN 978-1584888666. OCLC 144216834.
- Riesz, Frigyes; Sur la décomposition des opérations fonctionelles linéaires, Atti congress. internaz. mathematici (Bologna, 1928), 3, Zanichelli (1930) pp. 143–148
- Schaefer, Helmut H.; Wolff, Manfred P. (1999). Topological Vector Spaces. GTM. Vol. 8 (Second ed.). New York, NY: Springer New York Imprint Springer. ISBN 978-1-4612-7155-0. OCLC 840278135.
- Sobolev, V. I. (2001) [1994], "Riesz space", Encyclopedia of Mathematics, EMS Press, ISBN 978-1-4020-0609-8
- Zaanen, Adriaan C. (1996), Introduction to Operator Theory in Riesz spaces, Springer, ISBN 3-540-61989-5
