= Helmut H. Schaefer =

German mathematician (1925 – 2005)

Helmut Heinrich Schaefer
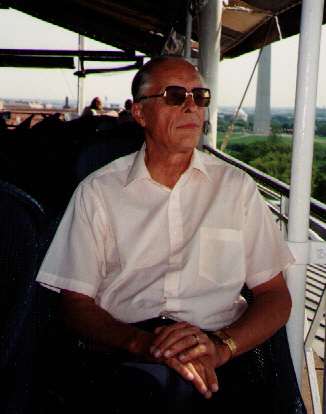
- Helmut Schaefer in 1989
- Born: February 14, 1925; Großenhain, Weimar Republic
- Died: December 16, 2005 (aged 80); Tübingen, Germany
- Education: TU Dresden; University of Leipzig
- Known for: Work on topological vector spaces, Schaefer's fixed point theorem
- Scientific career
- Institutions: University of Halle; University of Mainz; Washington State University; University of Michigan; University of Tübingen
- Doctoral advisor: Ernst Hölder
- Other academic advisors: Gottfried Köthe
- Doctoral students: Bertram John Walsh

Helmut Heinrich Schaefer (February 14, 1925 in Großenhain, Weimar Republic – December 16, 2005 in Tübingen, Germany) was a German mathematician, who worked primarily in functional analysis. His two best known scientific monographs are titled Topological Vector Spaces (1966) and Banach Lattices and Positive Operators (1974). The first of these was subsequently translated into Spanish and Russian. The second made him an internationally recognized and leading scholar in this particular field of mathematics. (Roquette & Wolff, 2006)

== Education and career ==
As teenager, Helmut Schaefer attended the Sankt Afra boarding school for gifted children in Meissen, Germany on a merit-based scholarship. In 1943, then 18, he was recruited to serve as interpreter of Anglo-American intelligence. After the war he studied mathematics at TU Dresden and University of Leipzig, where he earned his doctorate in 1951 and his habilitation in 1954. Prof. Ernst Hölder served as his academic advisor in Leipzig. In 1956 he accepted an offer from the University of Halle as professor of mathematics.

In 1957, Schaefer, his wife and two children escaped from East Germany to the Federal Republic. For one year, he worked under Prof. Gottfried Köthe at the University of Mainz. In 1958 he became associate professor at Washington State University at Pullman and a few years later he, his wife and now three children moved on to the University of Michigan at Ann Arbor. Then in 1963 he accepted an offer from the University of Tübingen in Germany where he remained until his retirement in 1990. In Tübingen he served two terms as department head.

Interrupting this period on several occasions and following retirement in Tübingen he spent a number of one-year terms or semesters as visiting or full professor at various American universities, including the University of Illinois Urbana-Champaign, the University of Maryland at College Park, the California Institute of Technology in Pasadena, Texas A&M University at College Station, and Florida Atlantic University at Boca Raton. He remained active in mathematical research until the year 1999, at which point he completely dedicated himself to his lifelong hobby of astronomy, especially astrophotography.

In 1978, Helmut Schaefer was accepted as full member of the Mathematics and Natural Sciences Class of the Heidelberg Academy of Sciences. Earlier, he was admitted to the Academy of Sciences in Zaragoza (Spain). Over the years, he was able to attract many students to functional analysis, combining an expectation of high achievement with a tolerant, humorous, and factual attitude. Ten of his doctoral students went on to become professors at various universities in Germany and the U.S. (Roquette & Wolff, 2006) His doctoral students include Wolfgang Arendt, Rainer Nagel, and Bertram John Walsh.

== Textbooks ==
- Schaefer, Helmut H.; Wolff, Manfred P. (1999). Topological Vector Spaces. GTM. Vol. 8 (Second ed.). New York, NY: Springer New York Imprint Springer. ISBN 978-1-4612-7155-0. OCLC 840278135.
