= Lightstone =

Lightstone may refer to the following:

- The Lightstone (2001), the first book of the Ea Cycle by David Zindell
- The Lightstone Group, a real estate investment company based in New York
- The Albert Harold Lightstone Scholarship at Queen's University, named for A. H. Lightstone

== People with the surname ==
- A. H. Lightstone (1926–1976), Canadian logician, mathematician, and Queen's University professor
- Jack N. Lightstone, Canadian professor of history, and president and vice-chancellor of Brock University in St. Catharines, Ontario
- Liz Lightstone (born 1959), British nephrologist
- Marilyn Lightstone (born 1940), Canadian film, television and voice actress
- Mordechai Lightstone (born 1984), American Chabad rabbi and AI ethics commentator
