= Luis Radford =

Mathematics educator

Luis Radford is professor at the School of Education Sciences at Laurentian University in Sudbury, Ontario, Canada. His research interests cover both theoretical and practical aspects of mathematics thinking, teaching, and learning. His current research draws on Lev Vygotsky's historical-cultural school of thought, as well as Evald Ilyenkov's epistemology, in a conceptual framework influenced by Emmanuel Levinas and Mikhail Bakhtin, leading to a non-utilitarian and a non-instrumentalist conception of the classroom and education.

Radford is an editor of the education journal For the Learning of Mathematics. In 2011 he was the recipient of the Hans Freudenthal Medal of the International Commission on Mathematical Instruction for his "development of a semiotic-cultural theory of learning".

He is the editor of book series "Semiotic Perspectives in the Teaching & Learning of Math" with Springer Verlag.

== Publications ==
- Radford, Luis (2003). "Gestures, Speech, and the Sprouting of Signs: A Semiotic-Cultural Approach to Students' Types of Generalization". Mathematical Thinking and Learning. 5 (1). Informa UK Limited: 37–70. doi:10.1207/s15327833mtl0501_02. ISSN 1098-6065. S2CID 55479541.
- Luis Radford (2000) Signs and meanings in students' emergent algebraic thinking: A semiotic analysis. Educational Studies in Mathematics 42 (3).
- Luis Radford (1997) On psychology, historical epistemology, and the teaching of mathematics: towards a socio-cultural history of mathematics. For the Learning of Mathematics 17 (1).
- Luis Radford (2002) The seen, the spoken and the written: A semiotic approach to the problem of objectification of mathematical knowledge. For the learning of mathematics 22 (2).
