= List of mathematics education journals =

This is a list of notable academic journals in the field of mathematics education.

== C ==
- College Mathematics Journal

== E ==
- Educational Studies in Mathematics

== F ==
- For the Learning of Mathematics

== I ==
- International Journal of Science and Mathematics Education
- Investigations in Mathematics Learning

== J ==
- Journal for Research in Mathematics Education
- Journal of Mathematics Teacher Education
- Journal on Mathematics Education

== M ==
- The Mathematics Educator
- The Mathematics Enthusiast
- Mathematics Teacher
- Mathematics Teaching

== P ==
- Philosophy of Mathematics Education Journal
- Problems, Resources, and Issues in Mathematics Undergraduate Studies

== S ==
- Science & Education

== T ==
- Teaching Mathematics and Its Applications

== See also ==
- List of probability journals
- List of statistics journals
- List of mathematics journals
