= David Wagner =

David Wagner may refer to:

- David L. Wagner (born 1956), American entomologist
- David Wagner, lead singer of American rock group Crow
- David Wagner (politician) (born 1979), Luxembourgish politician
- David Wagner (soccer) (born 1971), German-American soccer player and coach
- David Wagner (tennis) (born 1974), American wheelchair tennis player
- David A. Wagner (born 1974), American computer scientist
- David Wagner (judge) (1826–1902), Justice of the Supreme Court of Missouri
- David Wagner (mathematics education) (born 1965), Canadian mathematics education researcher
