= Concept image and concept definition =

In mathematics education, concept image and concept definition are two ways of understanding a mathematical concept.

The terms were introduced by Tall & Vinner (1981). They define a concept image as such:

"We shall use the term concept image to describe the total cognitive structure that is associated with the concept, which includes all the mental pictures and associated properties and processes. It is built up over the years through experiences of all kinds, changing as the individual meets new stimuli and matures."

A concept definition is similar to the usual notion of a definition in mathematics, with the distinction that it is personal to an individual:

"a personal concept definition can differ from a formal concept definition, the latter being a concept definition which is accepted by the mathematical community at large."

== Bibliography ==
- Tall, David; Vinner, Shlomo (May 1981), "Concept image and concept definition in mathematics with particular reference to limits and continuity" (PDF), Educational Studies in Mathematics, 12 (2): 151–169, doi:10.1007/BF00305619, S2CID 120226918
