= Principle of permanence =

Ancient mathematical principle

In the history of mathematics, the principle of permanence, or law of the permanence of equivalent forms, was the idea that algebraic operations like addition and multiplication should behave consistently in every number system, especially when developing extensions to established number systems.

Before the advent of modern mathematics and its emphasis on the axiomatic method, the principle of permanence was considered an important tool in mathematical arguments. In modern mathematics, arguments have instead been supplanted by rigorous proofs built upon axioms, and the principle is instead used as a heuristic for discovering new algebraic structures. Additionally, the principle has been formalized into a class of theorems called transfer principles, which state that all statements of some language that are true for some structure are true for another structure.

== History ==
The principle was described by George Peacock in his book A Treatise of Algebra (emphasis in original):

132. Let us again recur to this principle or law of the permanence of equivalent forms, and consider it when stated in the form of a direct and converse proportion.

"Whatever form is Algebraically equivalent to another, when expressed in general symbols, must be true, whatever those symbols denote."

Conversely, if we discover an equivalent form in Arithmetical Algebra or any other subordinate science, when the symbols are general in form though specific in their nature, the same must be an equivalent form, when the symbols are general in their nature as well as in their form.

The principle was later revised by Hermann Hankel and adopted by Giuseppe Peano, Ernst Mach, Hermann Schubert, Alfred Pringsheim, and others.

Around the same time period as A Treatise of Algebra, Augustin-Louis Cauchy published Cours d'Analyse, which used the term "generality of algebra" to describe (and criticize) a method of argument used by 18th century mathematicians like Euler and Lagrange that was similar to the Principle of Permanence.

== Applications ==
One of the main uses of the principle of permanence is to show that a functional equation that holds for the real numbers also holds for the complex numbers.

As an example, the equation $e^{s+t}-e^se^t=0$ hold for all real numbers s, t. By the principle of permanence for functions of two variables, this suggests that it holds for all complex numbers as well.

For a counter example, consider the following properties

- commutativity of addition: $x+y = y+x$ for all $x,y$,
- left-cancellative property of addition: if $x+y = x+z$, then $y=z$, for all $x,y,z$.

Both properties hold for all natural, integer, rational, real, and complex numbers. However, when following Georg Cantor's extensions of the natural numbers beyond infinity, neither satisfies both properties simultaneously.

- In ordinal arithmetic, addition is left-cancellative, but no longer commutative. For example, $3 + \omega = \omega \neq \omega+3$.
- In cardinal arithmetic, addition is commutative, but no longer left-cancellative, since $x+y = max \{x,y\}$ whenever $x$ or $y$ is infinite. For example, $\aleph_0 + 1 = \aleph_0 = \aleph_0 + 2$, but $1 \neq 2$.

Hence both of these, the early rigorous infinite number systems, violate the principle of permanence.
