= Journal of Mathematics Teacher Education =

- Discipline: Mathematics education
- Language: English
- Edited by: Despina Potari

Publication details
- History: 1998 – present
- Publisher: Springer (Netherlands)
- Frequency: 6 annual issues
- Impact factor: 2.298 (2020)

Standard abbreviations
- ISO 4: J. Math. Teach. Educ.

Indexing
- ISSN: 1386-4416 (print); 1573-1820 (web)

Links
- Journal homepage

Journal of Mathematics Teacher Education is a peer-reviewed scientific journal within the field of mathematics education. The journal was founded by Thomas J. Cooney, and it first appeared in 1998. Published by Springer, the journal normally appears in 6 annual issues. The journal is paginated by volume.

According to the official description of the journal, it "is devoted to research that seeks to improve the education of mathematics teachers and develop teaching methods that better enable mathematics students to learn".

== Associate editors ==
As of January 2013, the following served as associate editors for the journal:

- Olive Chapman, Editor-in-Chief, University of Calgary, Canada
- Gwendolyn Lloyd, Pennsylvania State University, USA
- Joao Pedro da Ponte, University of Lisbon, Portugal
- Despina Potari, University of Athens, Greece
- Margaret Walshaw, Massay University, New Zealand

== See also ==
- List of scientific journals in mathematics education
