= Arthur Bakker =

Dutch mathematician

- Born: January 3, 1970 (age 56)
- Scientific career
- Fields: Mathematics education
- Workplaces: Freudenthal Institute; Utrecht University; University of Bremen
- Thesis: Design research in statistics education: On symbolizing and computer tools (2004)
- Doctoral advisor: Koeno Gravemeijer; Gellof Kanselaar; Jan de Lange

Arthur Bakker (born January 3, 1970) is a Dutch mathematics education researcher and associate professor at the Freudenthal Institute, Utrecht University, Netherlands. He is Fellow at the University of Bremen.

== Service and Functions ==
He is editor-in-chief of Educational Studies in Mathematics. Before, he was associate editor of Educational Studies in Mathematics since 2014.

With Celia Hoyles, Phillip Kent, and Richard B. Noss, he is the co-author of Improving Mathematics at Work: The Need for Techno-Mathematical Literacies (Routledge, 2010).

His main area of expertise is mathematics education, but he has contributed also to a more general boundary-crossing framework, and to the development of design research in education as a methodological approach to improve education and education as a design science more generally. Other areas of interest include interest development, attitudes toward science and mathematics, inferentialism, scaffolding, and embodied design. Bakker is project leader of The Digital Turn in Epistemology project funded by NWO.

== Career ==
In 2004, Bakker graduated (PhD) on his dissertation titled Design research in statistics education: On symbolizing and computer tools, one of the first dissertations on design research (supervised by Koeno Gravemeijer, Gellof Kanselaar, and Jan de Lange). Alongside this project, he participated as advisor and curriculum author in the TinkerPlots project (NSF, ESI-9818946), directed by Cliff Konold (UMass, Amherst).

At the Institute of Education (now UCL), he was research officer with Phillip Kent, in the TLRP project Technomathematical Literacies in the workplace, codirected by Celia Hoyles and Richard Noss (2004–2007).

== Honours ==
In 1989, Bakker received the third prize in the National Mathematics Olympiad (Netherlands) and also the first prize in the Pythagoras Olympiad. Techno-Mathematical Literacies: Bakker co-authored Improving Mathematics at Work: The Need for Techno-Mathematical Literacies (2010), which explores the mathematical skills required in modern workplaces.
