= Procept =

In mathematics education, a procept is an amalgam of three components: a "process" which produces a mathematical "object" and a "symbol" which is used to represent either process or object. It derives from the work of Eddie Gray and David O. Tall.

The notion was first published in a paper in the Journal for Research in Mathematics Education in 1994, and is part of the process-object literature. This body of literature suggests that mathematical objects are formed by encapsulating processes, that is to say that the mathematical object 3 is formed by an encapsulation of the process of counting: 1,2,3...

Gray and Tall's notion of procept improved upon the existing literature by noting that mathematical notation is often ambiguous as to whether it refers to process or object. Examples of such notations are:

$3+4$ : refers to the process of adding as well as the outcome of the process.

$\sum_{n=0}^{\infty}(a_n)$ : refers to the process of summing an infinite sequence, and to the outcome of the process.

$f(x)=3x+2$ : refers to the process of mapping x to 3x+2 as well as the outcome of that process, the function $f$.
