= Saturday Night Seder =

- Created by: StoryCourse
- Written by: Alex Edelman (head writer); Hannah Friedman; Sas Goldberg; Josh Harmon; Adam Kantor; Michael Mitnick; Benj Pasek; Mark Sonnenblick
- Presented by: Jason Alexander
- Opening theme: Dayenu!
- Country of origin: United States
- Original languages: English; Hebrew

Production
- Executive producers: Erich Bergen; Talia Halperin; Adam Kantor; Benj Pasek
- Producers: Rebecca Halpern; Jen Snow; Rachel Sussman
- Production location: Virtual
- Editors: Ellen Callaghan; Shirley Chan; Lindsay Gordon; Mark Hall; Andrew Keenan-Bolger; David Mishler; Nick Shakra; Khaled Tabbara; Kelly Teacher; Jake Wilson
- Camera setup: Videotelephony
- Running time: 71 minutes
- Production company: StoryCourse

Original release
- Network: BuzzFeed; YouTube; StoryCourse
- Release: April 11, 2020

The Saturday Night Seder was a Passover Seder held on April 11, 2020 by StoryCourse in response to the COVID-19 pandemic; to provide relief and support to the public in an effort to combat the spread of the COVID-19 virus. The seder was sponsored by BuzzFeed and aired on their Tasty YouTube channel.

== Overview ==
The seder was hosted by Jason Alexander on the fourth night of Passover. The Saturday Seder coincided with the COVID-19 pandemic, which resulted in many physical seders being canceled throughout the world. The seder aimed to raise funds to benefit the CDC Foundation's Coronavirus Emergency Response Fund. In total, the seder raised more than $2.9 million for charity.

The seder covered the story of the Jewish Exodus from Egypt in a humorous light. It featured both Jews and non-Jews.

== Participants ==
=== Appearances ===
- Pamela Adlon
- Julie Klausner
- Fran Drescher
- David Wolpe*
- Kendell Pinkney
- Mayim Bialik
- Dana Benson*
- Ilana and Eliot Glazer
- Debra Messing
- Richard Kind
- Judith Light
- Amichai Lau-Lavie*
- Michael Solomonov
- Dan Levy
- Andy Cohen
- Nick Kroll
- Finn Wolfhard
- Joshua Malina
- Judy Gold
- Michael Zegen
- Jimmy Wolk
- D'Arcy Carden
- Billy Eichner
- Reza Aslan
- Tan France
- Beanie Feldstein
- Isaac Mizrahi
- Sarah Hurwitz
- Jessica Chaffin (as Ronna Glickman)
- Chuck Schumer
- Nina West
- Mordechai Lightstone*
- Alex Edelman
- Sharon Brous*
- Sarah Silverman
- Bette Midler
- Harvey Fierstein
- Whoopi Goldberg
- Dulcé Sloan
- Liz Feldman
- Adam Kantor
- Camryn Manheim
- Milo Manheim
- Busy Philipps
- Seth Rudetsky
- Ari Shapiro
- Leigh Silverman

* Rabbis who appeared in the seder.

=== Performances ===
Performers and songs
Artist(s)	Song(s)
Jason Alexander; Rachel Brosnahan; Darren Criss; Josh Groban	"Dayenu!"
Alan Menken	"Kiddush"
Ben Platt	"Somewhere Over the Rainbow"
Idina Menzel	"Ma Nishtanah"
Billy Porter; Henry Winkler	"Go Down Moses"
Stephen Schwartz; Shoshana Bean; Cynthia Erivo	"When You Believe"
Mark Sonnenblick; Shaina Taub; Skylar Astin	"Next Year"

== Broadcast ==
The Saturday Night Seder could be seen on BuzzFeed's Tasty YouTube Channel and was simulcasted on Saturday Night Seder's website and the CDC Foundation's website. In total, more than 1 million people watched the Saturday Night Seder.

== Performance of "When You Believe" ==
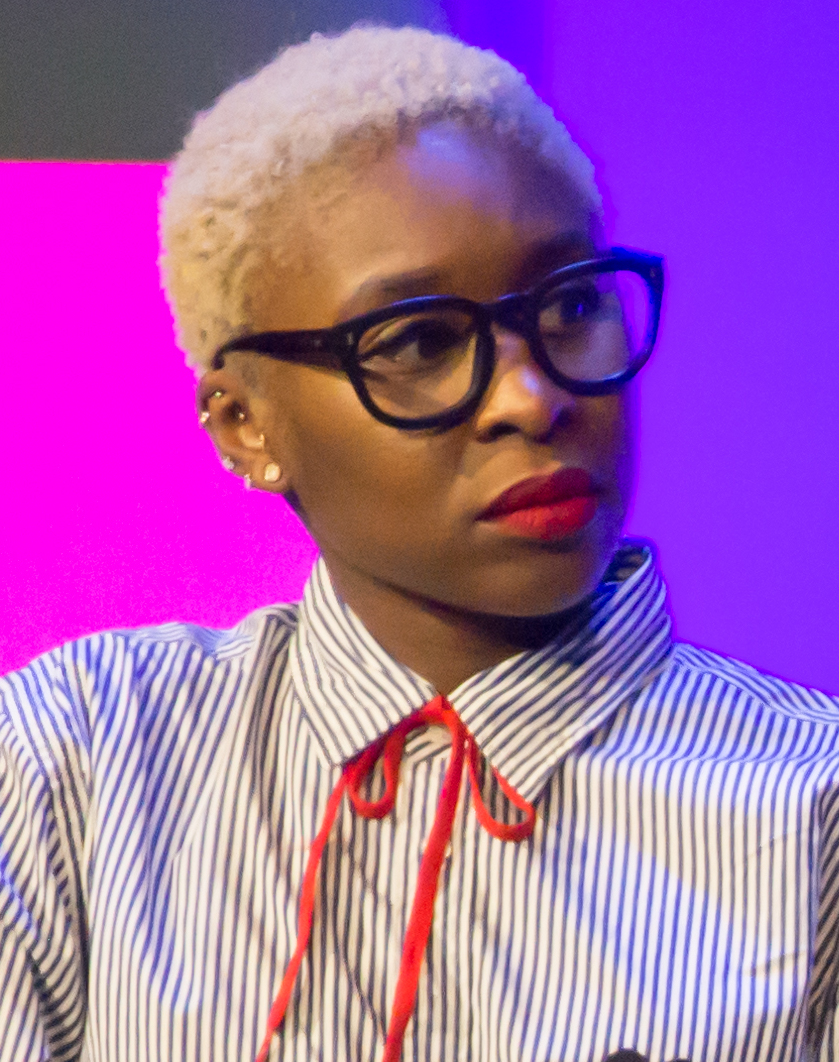
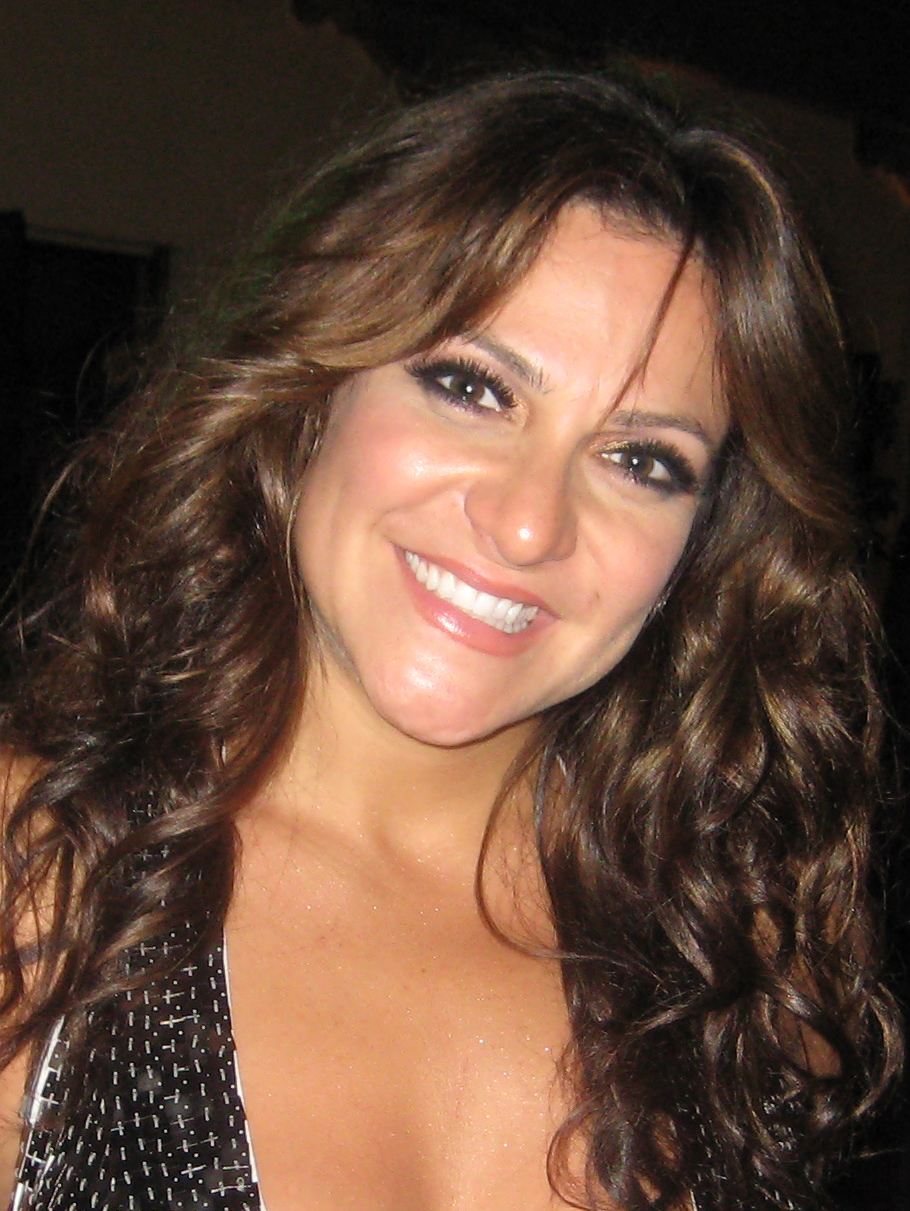
Cynthia Erivo (left) and Shoshana Bean were praised for their performance of "When You Believe".

Following its broadcast, the program became notable for Cynthia Erivo and Shoshana Bean's performance of "When You Believe" from the DreamWorks film The Prince of Egypt (1998), an animated depiction of the Exodus story. The song's composer and lyricist Stephen Schwartz provided the piano accompaniment. This performance received widespread acclaim as the program's highlight, thanks in part to the song's resurgence in visibility and popularity through the film's stage musical adaptation, which was running in the West End and suspended performances in response to the pandemic at the time. This led to Erivo and Bean's rendition receiving a studio recording and being released as a single (alongside the program's closing number "Next Year"), on June 30, 2020, by Ghostlight Records. The proceeds from the digital purchases of both songs benefitted the Jews for Racial and Economic Justice organization. Erivo would go on to perform the song with her Wicked co-star Ariana Grande at the 2024 Met Gala and by herself at the 35th National Memorial Day Concert in Washington, D.C., both in May 2024.

== See also ==
- Impact of the COVID-19 pandemic on the music industry
- iHeart Living Room Concert for America
- Together at Home
