= Generality of algebra =

18th-century argument in mathematics

In the history of mathematics, the generality of algebra was a phrase used by Augustin-Louis Cauchy to describe a method of argument that was used in the 18th century by mathematicians such as Leonhard Euler and Joseph-Louis Lagrange, particularly in manipulating infinite series. According to Koetsier, the generality of algebra principle assumed, roughly, that the algebraic rules that hold for a certain class of expressions can be extended to hold more generally on a larger class of objects, even if the rules are no longer obviously valid. As a consequence, 18th century mathematicians believed that they could derive meaningful results by applying the usual rules of algebra and calculus that hold for finite expansions even when manipulating infinite expansions.

In works such as Cours d'Analyse, Cauchy rejected the use of "generality of algebra" methods and sought a more rigorous foundation for mathematical analysis.

== Example ==
An example is Euler's derivation of the series

$\frac{\pi - x}{2} = \sin x + \frac{1}{2}\sin 2x + \frac{1}{3}\sin 3x+\cdots$	1

for $0<x<\pi$. He first evaluated the identity

$\frac{1-r\cos x}{1-2r\cos x + r^2} = 1 + r\cos x + r^2\cos2x+r^3\cos 3x+\cdots$	2

at $r=1$ to obtain

$0 = \frac{1}{2} + \cos x + \cos 2x + \cos 3x + \cdots.$	3

The infinite series on the right hand side of (3) diverges for all real $x$. But nevertheless integrating this term-by-term gives (1), an identity which is known to be true by Fourier analysis.

== See also ==
- Principle of permanence
- Transfer principle
