= Teaching Mathematics and Its Applications =

- Discipline: Mathematics education
- Language: English
- Edited by: Chris Sangwin, Duncan Lawson, Cathy Smith

Publication details
- History: 1982–present
- Publisher: Oxford University Press on behalf of the Institute of Mathematics and its Applications (United Kingdom)
- Frequency: Quarterly
- Open access: Hybrid

Standard abbreviations
- ISO 4: Teach. Math. Its Appl.

Indexing
- ISSN: 0268-3679 (print); 1471-6976 (web)
- OCLC no.: 47191786

Links
- Journal homepage; Online access

Teaching Mathematics and Its Applications is a quarterly peer-reviewed academic journal in the field of mathematics education. The Journal was established in 1982 and is published by Oxford University Press on behalf of the Institute of Mathematics and its Applications. The editors-in-chief are Duncan Lawson (Coventry University), Chris Sangwin (University of Edinburgh), and Cathy Smith (Open University).

The journal is abstracted and indexed in the British Education Index, Education Research Abstracts, Educational Management Abstracts, Educational Technology Abstracts, MathEduc Database, and ProQuest databases.

== See also ==
- List of mathematics education journals
