= David Wagner (mathematics education) =

Canadian mathematics educator

- Wagner in 2019

Academic background
- Education: PhD, University of Alberta

David Wagner (born 1965) is a Canadian mathematics educator and full professor at the University of New Brunswick, Fredericton, Canada. He is an adjunct professor (professor II) at the University of South-Eastern Norway. Wagner wrote for CBC News and EdCan.

== Service and functions ==
He is co-editor-in-chief of Educational Studies in Mathematics. Previously, he was an associate editor of Educational Studies in Mathematics since 2016. He was managing editor of For the Learning of Mathematics from 2011 to 2018. Wagner also published articles for CBC News and EdCan in 2014 and 2015.

His main area of expertise is mathematics education.
