= A. H. Lightstone =

Canadian mathematician

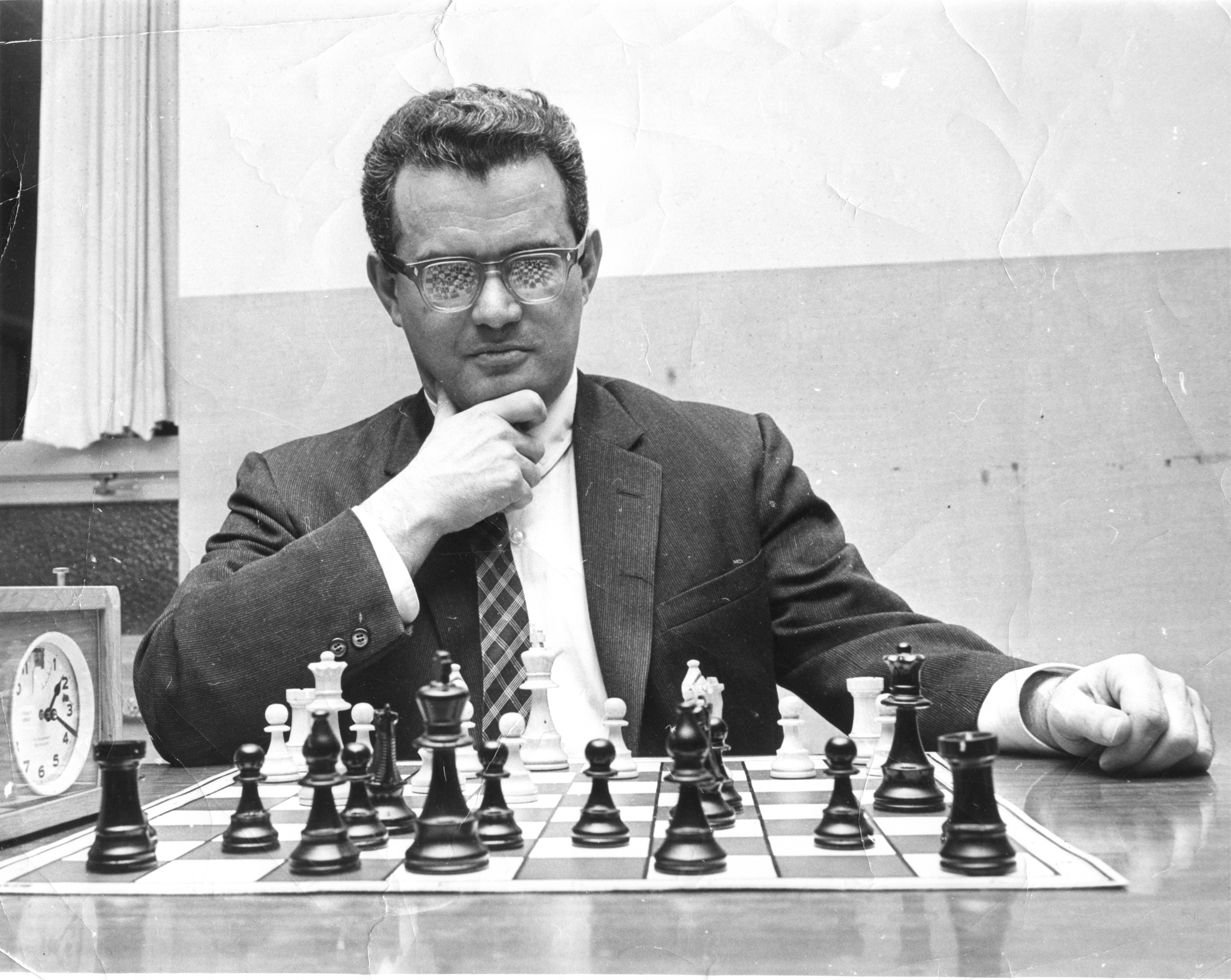
A.H. Lightstone at chess

Albert Harold Lightstone (1926–1976) was a Canadian mathematician. He was one of the pioneers of non-standard analysis, a doctoral student of Abraham Robinson, and later a co-author with Robinson of the book Nonarchimedean Fields and Asymptotic Expansions.

== Biography ==
Lightstone earned his PhD from the University of Toronto in 1955, under the supervision of Abraham Robinson; his thesis was entitled Contributions To The Theory Of Quantification. He was a professor of mathematics at Carleton University and Queen's University.

== Research ==
=== Decimal hyperreals ===
In his article "Infinitesimals" in the American Mathematical Monthly in 1972, Lightstone described an extended decimal notation for the hyperreals. Here there is a digit at every hypernatural rank rather than merely a digit for every rank given by a natural number. Such a hyperreal decimal is written as

$$a.a_1 a_2 \ldots ; \ldots a_{H-1} a_H a_{H+1} \ldots\,.$$

Here the digit $a_H$ appears at rank $H$, which is a typical infinite hypernatural. The semicolon separates the digits at finite ranks from the digits at infinite ranks. Thus, the number 0.000...;...01, with digit "1" at infinite rank H, corresponds to the infinitesimal $10^{-H}$.

The difference 1 - 0.000...;...01 is 0.999...;...99, with an infinite hypernatural's worth of digits 9. An alternative notation for the latter is

$$0.\underbrace{999\ldots9 }_H \,$$

where H is an infinite hypernatural. The extended decimal notation provides a rigorous mathematical implementation of student intuitions of an infinitesimal of the form 0.000...01. Such student intuitions and their usefulness in the learning of infinitesimal calculus were analyzed in a 2010 study by Robert Ely in the Journal for Research in Mathematics Education.

=== Other research ===
Lightstone's main research contributions were in non-standard analysis. He also wrote papers on angle trisection, matrix inversion, and applications of group theory to formal logic.

== Books ==
Lightstone was the author or co-author of several books on mathematics:

- The Axiomatic Method: An Introduction to Mathematical Logic (Prentice Hall, 1964). This introductory textbook is divided into two parts, one providing an informal introduction to Boolean logic and the second using formal methods to prove the consistency and completeness of the predicate calculus. It is aimed at students who already have some familiarity with abstract algebra, and one of its themes is an algebraic view of mathematical proofs in logic.
- Concepts of Calculus (Harper and Row, 1965). This is a textbook on the calculus of real functions of a single variable. Reviewer D. R. Dickinson wrote that it "contains much novel and interesting material"; however, he also complained of its pedantic avoidance of variables (using identity functions in their place), its unnecessary insistence on considering only functions whose derivative has the same domain as the function itself, and its "dull and lengthy discussions of elementary topics".
  - Concepts of Calculus, vol. 2 (Harper and Row, 1966)
  - Solutions to the exercises for Concepts of Calculus (Harper and Row, 1966)
- Fundamentals of Linear Algebra (Appleton-Century-Crofts, 1969, ISBN 0-390-56050-2)
- Symbolic Logic and the Real Number System: an Introduction to the Foundations of Number Systems (Harper and Row, 1965). This book provides a course in the construction of the real numbers based on formal logic. Its goal is both to show how the real numbers can be developed from simpler concepts in arithmetic, and to demonstrate the impact of logic on the rest of mathematics. As well as covering the title topics, it also contains a long section on the axioms for several algebraic structures: groups, rings, fields, and Boolean algebras. One idiosyncrasy is that, rather than axiomatizing the real numbers using Dedekind cuts or Cauchy sequences, it bases its axiomatization on sequences of decimal numbers.
- Nonarchimedean Fields and Asymptotic Expansions (with Abraham Robinson, North-Holland, 1975). 2016 pbk reprint. This is an introductory textbook that attempts to make the material from Robinson's 1966 monograph Non-Standard Analysis more accessible, and to demonstrate the usefulness of non-standard analysis in studying asymptotic expansions. It was based on an initial draft by Robinson, and finished posthumously by Lightstone, who himself died soon after. It begins with an introduction to non-Archimedean fields with many helpful examples, brings in the necessary tools from mathematical logic including ultrapowers, spends two chapters describing how to do non-standard analysis using the Levi-Civita field, and finishes with three chapters on asymptotic expansions.
- Mathematical Logic: An Introduction to Model Theory (Mathematical Concepts and Methods in Science and Engineering, vol. 9, Plenum Press, 1978, ISBN 0-306-30894-0). This book was published posthumously, edited by Herbert Enderton. It is organized into three parts, one on the propositional calculus, a second part on formal semantics, and a third part on applications of model theory including nonstandard analysis and set theory. However, it was criticized for the slow pace of its first section and for its overall lack of mathematical rigor.

== Awards and honours ==
Queen's University annually awards the Albert Harold Lightstone Scholarship, named for Lightstone, to a fourth year honors undergraduate student majoring in mathematics or statistics. The scholarship was established by Lightstone's wife after his death.
