= Transfer principle =

Concept in model theory

In model theory, a transfer principle states that all statements of some language that are true for some structure are true for another structure. One of the first examples was the Lefschetz principle, which states that any sentence in the first-order language of fields that is true for the complex numbers is also true for any algebraically closed field of characteristic 0.

== History ==
An incipient form of a transfer principle was described by Leibniz under the name of "the Law of Continuity". Here infinitesimals are expected to have the "same" properties as appreciable numbers. The transfer principle can also be viewed as a rigorous formalization of the principle of permanence. Similar tendencies are found in Cauchy, who used infinitesimals to define both the continuity of functions (in Cours d'Analyse) and a form of the Dirac delta function.

In 1955, Jerzy Łoś proved the transfer principle for any hyperreal number system. Its most common use is in Abraham Robinson's nonstandard analysis of the hyperreal numbers, where the transfer principle states that any sentence expressible in a certain formal language that is true of real numbers is also true of hyperreal numbers.

== Transfer principle for the hyperreals ==
The transfer principle concerns the logical relation between the properties of the real numbers R, and the properties of a larger field denoted *R called the hyperreal numbers. The field *R includes, in particular, infinitesimal ("infinitely small") numbers, providing a rigorous mathematical realisation of a project initiated by Leibniz.

The idea is to express analysis over R in a suitable language of mathematical logic, and then point out that this language applies equally well to *R. This turns out to be possible because at the set-theoretic level, the propositions in such a language are interpreted to apply only to internal sets rather than to all sets. As Robinson put it, the sentences of [the theory] are interpreted in *R in Henkin's sense.

The theorem to the effect that each proposition valid over R, is also valid over *R, is called the transfer principle.

There are several different versions of the transfer principle, depending on what model of nonstandard mathematics is being used. In terms of model theory, the transfer principle states that a map from a standard model to a nonstandard model is an elementary embedding (an embedding preserving the truth values of all statements in a language), or sometimes a bounded elementary embedding (similar, but only for statements with bounded quantifiers).

The transfer principle appears to lead to contradictions if it is not handled correctly. For example, since the hyperreal numbers form a non-Archimedean ordered field and the reals form an Archimedean ordered field, the property of being Archimedean ("every positive real is larger than $1/n$ for some positive integer $n$") seems at first sight not to satisfy the transfer principle. The statement "every positive hyperreal is larger than $1/n$ for some positive integer $n$" is false; however the correct interpretation is "every positive hyperreal is larger than $1/n$ for some positive hyperinteger $n$". In other words, the hyperreals appear to be Archimedean to an internal observer living in the nonstandard universe, but appear to be non-Archimedean to an external observer outside the universe.

A freshman-level accessible formulation of the transfer principle is Keisler's book Elementary Calculus: An Infinitesimal Approach.

=== Example ===
Every real $x$ satisfies the inequality
$$x \geq \lfloor x \rfloor,$$
where $\lfloor \,\cdot\, \rfloor$ is the integer part function. By a typical application of the transfer principle, every hyperreal $x$ satisfies the inequality
$$x \geq {}^{*}\! \lfloor x \rfloor,$$
where ${}^{*}\! \lfloor \,\cdot\, \rfloor$ is the natural extension of the integer part function. If $x$ is infinite, then the hyperinteger ${}^{*}\! \lfloor x \rfloor$ is infinite, as well.

== Generalizations of the concept of number ==
Historically, the concept of number has been repeatedly generalized. The addition of 0 to the natural numbers $\mathbb{N}$ was a major intellectual accomplishment in its time. The addition of negative integers to form $\mathbb{Z}$ already constituted a departure from the realm of immediate experience to the realm of mathematical models. The further extension, the rational numbers $\mathbb{Q}$, is more familiar to a layperson than their completion $\mathbb{R}$, partly because the reals do not correspond to any physical reality (in the sense of measurement and computation) different from that represented by $\mathbb{Q}$. Thus, the notion of an irrational number is meaningless to even the most powerful floating-point computer. The necessity for such an extension stems not from physical observation but rather from the internal requirements of mathematical coherence. The infinitesimals entered mathematical discourse at a time when such a notion was required by mathematical developments at the time, namely the emergence of what became known as the infinitesimal calculus. As already mentioned above, the mathematical justification for this latest extension was delayed by three centuries. Keisler wrote:

"In discussing the real line we remarked that we have no way of knowing what a line in physical space is really like. It might be like the hyperreal line, the real line, or neither. However, in applications of the calculus, it is helpful to imagine a line in physical space as a hyperreal line."

The self-consistent development of the hyperreals turned out to be possible if every true first-order logic statement that uses basic arithmetic (the natural numbers, plus, times, comparison) and quantifies only over the real numbers was assumed to be true in a reinterpreted form if we presume that it quantifies over hyperreal numbers. For example, we can state that for every real number there is another number greater than it:

$$\forall x \in \mathbb{R} \quad \exists y \in\mathbb{R}\quad   x < y.$$

The same will then also hold for hyperreals:

$$\forall x \in {}^\star\mathbb{R} \quad \exists y \in {}^\star\mathbb{R}\quad  x < y.$$

Another example is the statement that if you add 1 to a number you get a bigger number:

$$\forall x \in \mathbb{R} \quad x < x+1$$

which will also hold for hyperreals:

$$\forall x \in {}^\star\mathbb{R} \quad  x < x+1.$$

The correct general statement that formulates these equivalences is called the transfer principle. Note that, in many formulas in analysis, quantification is over higher-order objects such as functions and sets, which makes the transfer principle somewhat more subtle than the above examples suggest.

== Differences between R and ^{*}R ==
The transfer principle however doesn't mean that R and *R have identical behavior. For instance, in *R there exists an element ω such that

$$1<\omega, \quad 1+1<\omega, \quad 1+1+1<\omega, \quad 1+1+1+1<\omega, \ldots$$

but there is no such number in R. This is possible because the nonexistence of this number cannot be expressed as a first order statement of the above type. A hyperreal number like ω is called infinitely large; the reciprocals of the infinitely large numbers are the infinitesimals.

The hyperreals *R form an ordered field containing the reals R as a subfield. Unlike the reals, the hyperreals do not form a standard metric space, but by virtue of their order they carry an order topology.

== Constructions of the hyperreals ==
The hyperreals can be developed either axiomatically or by more constructively oriented methods. The essence of the axiomatic approach is to assert (1) the existence of at least one infinitesimal number, and (2) the validity of the transfer principle. In the following subsection we give a detailed outline of a more constructive approach. This method allows one to construct the hyperreals if given a set-theoretic object called an ultrafilter, but the ultrafilter itself cannot be explicitly constructed. Vladimir Kanovei and Shelah give a construction of a definable, countably saturated elementary extension of the structure consisting of the reals and all finitary relations on it.

In its most general form, transfer is a bounded elementary embedding between structures.

== Statement ==
The ordered field ^{*}R of nonstandard real numbers properly includes the real field R. Like all ordered fields that properly include R, this field is non-Archimedean. It means that some members x ≠ 0 of ^{*}R are infinitesimal, i.e.,

$\underbrace{\left|x\right|+\cdots+\left|x\right|}_{n \text{ terms}} < 1$ for every finite cardinal number n.

The only infinitesimal in R is 0. Some other members of ^{*}R, the reciprocals y of the nonzero infinitesimals, are infinite, i.e.,

$\underbrace{1+\cdots+1}_{n\text{ terms}}<\left|y\right|$ for every finite cardinal number n.

The underlying set of the field ^{*}R is the image of R under a mapping A ↦ ^{*}A from subsets A of R to subsets of ^{*}R. In every case

$$A \subseteq {^*\!A},$$

with equality if and only if A is finite. Sets of the form ^{*}A for some $\scriptstyle A\,\subseteq\,\mathbb{R}$ are called standard subsets of ^{*}R. The standard sets belong to a much larger class of subsets of ^{*}R called internal sets. Similarly each function

$$f:A\rightarrow\mathbb{R}$$

extends to a function

$${^*\! f} : {^*\!A} \rightarrow {^*\mathbb{R}};$$

these are called standard functions, and belong to the much larger class of internal functions. Sets and functions that are not internal are external.

The importance of these concepts stems from their role in the following proposition and is illustrated by the examples that follow it.

The transfer principle:

- Suppose a proposition that is true of ^{*}R can be expressed via functions of finitely many variables (e.g. (x, y) ↦ x + y), relations among finitely many variables (e.g. x ≤ y), finitary logical connectives such as and, or, not, if...then..., and the quantifiers

$$\forall x\in\mathbb{R}\text{ and }\exists x\in\mathbb{R}.$$

For example, one such proposition is

$$\forall x\in\mathbb{R} \ \exists y\in\mathbb{R} \ x+y=0.$$

Such a proposition is true in R if and only if it is true in ^{*}R when the quantifier

$$\forall x \in {^*\!\mathbb{R}}$$

replaces

$$\forall x\in\mathbb{R},$$

and similarly for $\exists$.

- Suppose a proposition otherwise expressible as simply as those considered above mentions some particular sets $\scriptstyle A\,\subseteq\,\mathbb{R}$. Such a proposition is true in R if and only if it is true in ^{*}R with each such "A" replaced by the corresponding ^{*}A. Here are two examples:

- The set

$$[0,1]^\ast = \{\,x\in\mathbb{R}:0\leq x\leq 1\,\}^\ast$$

must be

$$\{\,x \in {^*\mathbb{R}} : 0 \le x \le 1 \,\},$$

including not only members of R between 0 and 1 inclusive, but also members of ^{*}R between 0 and 1 that differ from those by infinitesimals. To see this, observe that the sentence

$$\forall x\in\mathbb{R} \ (x\in [0,1] \text{ if and only if } 0\leq x \leq 1)$$

is true in R, and apply the transfer principle.

- The set ^{*}N must have no upper bound in ^{*}R (since the sentence expressing the non-existence of an upper bound of N in R is simple enough for the transfer principle to apply to it) and must contain n + 1 if it contains n, but must not contain anything between n and n + 1. Members of

$${^*\mathbb{N}} \setminus \mathbb{N}$$

are "infinite integers".)

- Suppose a proposition otherwise expressible as simply as those considered above contains the quantifier

$$\forall A\subseteq\mathbb{R}\dots\text{ or }\exists A\subseteq\mathbb{R}\dots\ .$$

Such a proposition is true in R if and only if it is true in ^{*}R after the changes specified above and the replacement of the quantifiers with

$$[\forall \text{ internal } A\subseteq{^*\mathbb{R}}\dots]$$

and

$$[\exists \text{ internal } A\subseteq{^*\mathbb{R}}\dots]\ .$$

== Three examples ==
The appropriate setting for the hyperreal transfer principle is the world of internal entities. Thus, the well-ordering property of the natural numbers by transfer yields the fact that every internal subset of $\mathbb{N}$ has a least element. In this section internal sets are discussed in more detail.

- Every nonempty internal subset of ^{*}R that has an upper bound in ^{*}R has a least upper bound in ^{*}R. Consequently the set of all infinitesimals is external.
  - The well-ordering principle implies every nonempty internal subset of ^{*}N has a smallest member. Consequently the set

$${^*\mathbb{N}} \setminus \mathbb{N}$$

of all infinite integers is external.

- If n is an infinite integer, then the set {1, ..., n} (which is not standard) must be internal. To prove this, first observe that the following is trivially true:

$$\forall n\in\mathbb{N} \ \exists A\subseteq\mathbb{N} \ \forall x\in\mathbb{N} \ [x\in A \text{ iff } x \leq n].$$

Consequently

$$\forall n \in {^*\mathbb{N}} \ \exists \text{ internal } A \subseteq {^*\mathbb{N}} \ \forall x \in {^*\mathbb{N}} \ [x\in A \text{ iff } x\leq n].$$

- As with internal sets, so with internal functions: Replace

$$\forall f : A \rightarrow \mathbb{R} \dots$$

with

$$\forall\text{ internal } f: {^*\!A}\rightarrow {^*\mathbb{R}} \dots$$

when applying the transfer principle, and similarly with $\exists$ in place of $\forall$.
For example: If n is an infinite integer, then the complement of the image of any internal one-to-one function ƒ from the infinite set {1, ..., n} into {1, ..., n, n + 1, n + 2, n + 3} has exactly three members by the transfer principle. Because of the infiniteness of the domain, the complements of the images of one-to-one functions from the former set to the latter come in many sizes, but most of these functions are external.

This last example motivates an important definition: A *-finite (pronounced star-finite) subset of ^{*}R is one that can be placed in internal one-to-one correspondence with {1, ..., n} for some n ∈ ^{*}N.

== See also ==
- Elementary Calculus: An Infinitesimal Approach
- Principle of Permanence
- Generality of algebra
