= Anna Sierpińska =

Polish-Canadian mathematics educator

Anna Sierpińska (1947 – October 19, 2023) was a Polish-Canadian scholar of mathematics education, known for her investigations of understanding and epistemology in mathematics education. She was a professor emerita of mathematics and statistics at Concordia University.

== Education and career ==
Sierpińska was born in Wrocław in 1947, and lived internationally with her family as a child. She earned a master's degree in 1970 from the University of Warsaw, specializing in commutative algebra. She completed her Ph.D. in mathematics education in 1984 at the Higher School of Pedagogy, Cracow.

She was editor-in-chief of Educational Studies in Mathematics from 2001 to 2005.

== Recognition ==
In 2006, Luleå University of Technology in Sweden gave Sierpińska an honorary doctorate.

== Selected publications ==
=== Monograph ===
- Sierpinska, Anna (1994), Understanding in Mathematics, The Falmer Press, doi:10.4324/9780203454183, ISBN 978-0-203-45418-3

=== Edited volumes ===
- Sierpinska, Anna; Kilpatrick, Jeremy, eds. (1998), Mathematics Education as a Research Domain: A Search for Identity, New ICMI Study Series, vol. 4, Springer Netherlands, doi:10.1007/978-94-011-5470-3, ISBN 978-94-011-5470-3
- Steinbring, Heinz; Bussi, Maria G. Bartolini; Sierpinska, Anna, eds. (1998), Language and Communication in the Mathematics Classroom, National Council of Teachers of Mathematics

=== Articles ===
- Sierpińska, Anna (November 1987), "Humanities students and epistemological obstacles related to limits", Educational Studies in Mathematics, 18 (4): 371–397, doi:10.1007/bf00240986, S2CID 144880659
- Sierpinska, Anna (November 1990), "Some remarks on understanding in mathematics", For the Learning of Mathematics, 10 (3): 24–36, 41, JSTOR 40247990
- Sierpinska, Anna; Lerman, Stephen (1997), "Epistemologies of mathematics and of mathematics education", in Bishop, Alan J.; Clements, Ken; Keitel, Christine; Kilpatrick, Jeremy; Laborde, Colette (eds.), International Handbook of Mathematics Education, Springer Netherlands, pp. 827–876, doi:10.1007/978-94-009-1465-0_23
- Sierpinska, Anna (2000), "On some aspects of students' thinking in linear algebra", in Dorier, Jean-Luc (ed.), On the Teaching of Linear Algebra, Mathematics Education Library, vol. 23, Kluwer Academic Publishers, pp. 209–246, doi:10.1007/0-306-47224-4_8, ISBN 978-0-306-47224-4
- Dorier, Jean-Luc; Sierpinska, Anna (2002), "Research into the teaching and learning of linear algebra", in Holton, Derek; Artigue, Michèle; Kirchgräber, Urs; Hillel, Joel; Niss, Mogens; Schoenfeld, Alan (eds.), The Teaching and Learning of Mathematics at University Level, New ICMI Study Series, vol. 7, Kluwer Academic Publishers, pp. 255–273, doi:10.1007/0-306-47231-7_24, ISBN 0-7923-7191-7
