= Mordechai Lightstone =

American Chabad rabbi

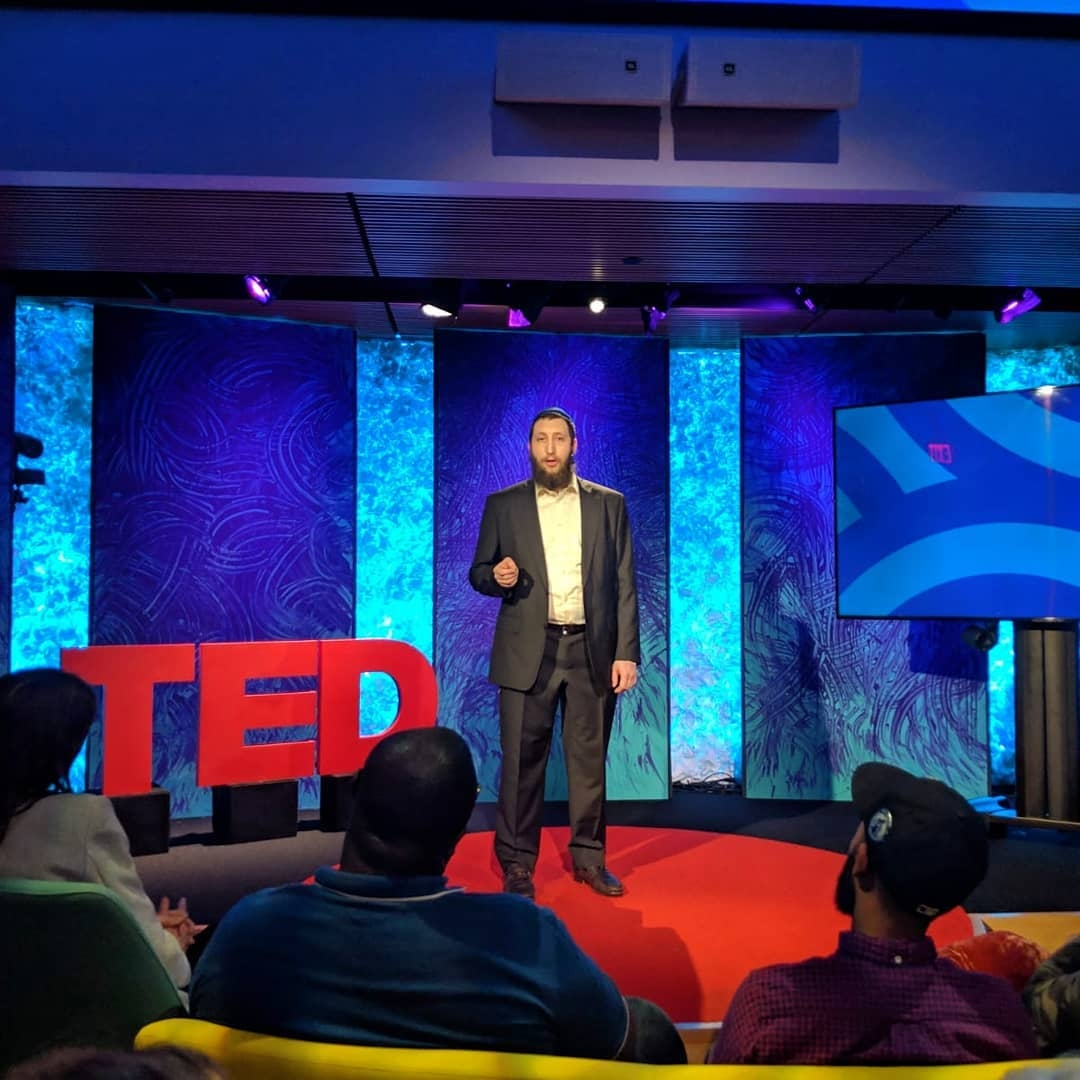
- Lightstone as a TED resident in 2018
- Born: 1984 (age 41–42)
- Occupation: Social media director for Chabad.org

Mordechai Lightstone (born 1984) is a Chabad rabbi who directs social media for Chabad.org and is the founder of Tech Tribe.

== Biography ==
Lightstone was an early social media adopter, helping to start the Chabad-Lubavitch presence on Twitter in 2008, and later Snapchat. Lightstone has been described as "Twitter’s most prominent rabbi", regularly tweeting from his personal account in addition to the account he manages for Chabad.

=== Tech Tribe ===
Lightstone directs Tech Tribe, along with his wife Chana. It is an organization for Jewish people in technology and hosts events such as the #openShabbat Friday night dinner at SXSW and Comic-Con.

In 2021 they launched a project to create an NFT Torah.

Following the October 7 attacks, Tech Tribe became a hub of support for Jews in tech, organizing a solidarity trip to Israel and events raising awareness for hostages, including Amazon employee Sasha Trufanov. Lightstone also met with Israel’s Minister of Innovation, Science and Technology Gila Gamliel to highlight challenges faced by Jews in the tech sector.

Lightstone has also engaged publicly with ethical and spiritual questions surrounding artificial intelligence, contributing a Jewish perspective to ongoing discussions about emerging technologies.

== Appearances and recognition ==
Lightstone was a 2018 TED resident speaking about bringing "centuries-old wisdom to modern-day social media".

In April 2020, Lightstone was featured in the Saturday Night Seder alongside other Jewish personalities.

In June 2021, Lightstone was awarded a Rockower Award for his column on Al Jaffee.

In July 2021, Lightstone was named as one of The Jewish Week's 36 under 36.

== Personal life ==
Lightstone lives with his wife Chana in Brooklyn, New York. Together they have seven children.
