= Liz Lightstone =

British physician, consultant and professor

Elizabeth Lightstone
- Born: Elizabeth Beatrice Lightstone; 1959 (age 66–67)
- Education: University of Cambridge; King's College London; University of London
- Scientific career
- Fields: Kidney disease Lupus nephritis Pregnancy in women with kidney disease Chronic kidney disease
- Workplaces: Hammersmith Hospital; Guy's Hospital; Imperial College London
- Thesis: Characterization of the murine T cell subsets defined by CD45RA isoforms (1993)
- Website: professorlizlightstone.co.uk

Elizabeth Beatrice Lightstone (born March 1959) is a British physician and consultant who is a Professor of Nephrology at Imperial College London. Her research investigates disease in kidneys such as lupus nephritis, glomerular disease and chronic kidney disease (CKD). Lightstone has also investigated healthcare inequalities.

== Early life and education ==
Lightstone completed her undergraduate studies in medicine at the University of Cambridge. She moved to King's College London for her clinical studies, and was one of the University of London's top candidates in her Bachelor of Medicine, Bachelor of Surgery. Lightstone was a clinical fellow at Guy's Hospital and Hammersmith Hospital, where she specialised in renal medicine. At the time, there were no woman consultants of nephrology in England. She joined the University College London Cancer Research Fund, where she researched murine T-cell subsets. After earning her doctorate in 1993, Lightstone moved to the Hammersmith Hospital as a Medical Research Council Clinical Fellow.

== Research and career ==
Lightstone was appointed a Clinical Lecturer in Nephrology in 1995. Her research has considered lupus nephritis and the development of new therapeutics. She served as Chief Investigator on the RITUXILUP trial, which involved a rituximab treatment regimen. The regimen involved sequential intravenous doses of rituximab and methylprednisolone, and was shown to be a safe and efficatious protocol. She has explored other therapeutics, including voclosporin and belimumab. Alongside development new treatment strategies, Lightstone searched for urine biomarkers that could be indicative of the outcome of lupus nephritis. Lighthouse has written the clinical guidelines on the management of lupus nephritis in adults and the management of pregnancy in women with lupus. Alongside rituximab, Lighthouse investigated glomerulonephritis and chronic kidney disease, and how health inequalities are experienced by people of colour.

During the COVID-19 pandemic, Lightstone focused on how to treat COVID-19 patients with kidney disease. She was Chair of the Central and North West London NHS Foundation Trust Treatment and Guideline Group. She explained that patients on dialysis had a very high infection rate, which she attributed to their frequent hospital visits. Her work was recognised with a Queen's Anniversary Prize for COVID-19 Response.

== Selected publications ==
- George K Bertsias; Maria Tektonidou; Zahir Amoura; et al. (2012). "Joint European League Against Rheumatism and European Renal Association-European Dialysis and Transplant Association (EULAR/ERA-EDTA) recommendations for the management of adult and paediatric lupus nephritis". Annals of the Rheumatic Diseases. 71 (11): 1771–1782. doi:10.1136/annrheumdis-2012-201940. PMC 3465859. PMID 22851469. Wikidata Q36302245.
- Marie Condon; Damien Ashby; Ruth J Pepper; H Terence Cook; Jeremy B Levy; Megan Griffith; Tom D Cairns; Liz Lightstone (2013). "Prospective observational single-centre cohort study to evaluate the effectiveness of treating lupus nephritis with rituximab and mycophenolate mofetil but no oral steroids". Annals of the Rheumatic Diseases. 72 (8): 1280–1286. doi:10.1136/annrheumdis-2012-202844. PMID 23740227. Wikidata Q43472878.
- John C Chambers; Weihua Zhang; Graham M Lord; et al. (2010). "Genetic loci influencing kidney function and chronic kidney disease". Nature Genetics. 42 (5): 373–375. doi:10.1038/ng.566. PMC 3748585. PMID 20383145. Wikidata Q34109552.
