= Investigations in Mathematics Learning =

Investigations in Mathematics Learning is the official research journal of the Research Council for Mathematics Learning. RCML seeks to stimulate, generate, coordinate, and disseminate research efforts designed to understand and/or influence factors that affect mathematics learning.
