= Charles Davies (professor) =

American mathematician (1798–1876)

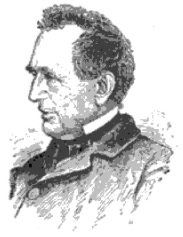
- Born: January 22, 1798; Washington, Connecticut
- Died: September 17, 1876 (aged 78); Fishkill, New York
- Burial place: Davies Cemetery, Oswegatchie, New York
- Education: United States Military Academy
- Occupations: professor, author
- Notable work: Mathematics textbooks
- Family: Thomas Alfred Davies, brother

Charles Davies (January 22, 1798 – September 17, 1876) was a professor of mathematics at the United States Military Academy, notable for writing a series of mathematical textbooks.

== Biography ==
Davies was born in Washington, Connecticut. His father was a County Sheriff or County Judge. During Davies' early years, the family moved to St Lawrence County, New York, where he was educated in local schools. He entered the US Military Academy at West Point in December 1813, through the influence of General Joseph Swift, who had met Davies' father during the War of 1812. Davies had earned praise for the services rendered to General James Wilkinson's army in the Descent of the St. Lawerence during the fall of 1813. Having been brought up on the frontier, Davies had had little formal education, but he had no difficulty in pursuing the courses at the academy. He graduated from the academy in December 1815.

He joined the Light Artillery as a Bvt. Second Lieut. on December 11, 1815. He served a year in garrison at New England posts till August 31, 1816, when he was transferred to the Corps of Engineers. He resigned from the Army on December 1, 1816, and took a post as Assistant Professor of Mathematics at West Point. He became a Professor in May 1823.

Davies resigned from West Point in May 1837. From 1839 till 1841, he was a professor at Trinity College in Hartford, Connecticut, wherein he established a connection with Alfred Smith Barnes for publication of his books. He resigned from this position due to illness. He was reappointed in the army as a paymaster in November 1841, and was the Treasurer at West Point from December 11, 1841, to December 19, 1846. In 1848, he joined the New York University as a Professor of Mathematics and Natural Philosophy. Upon his retirement a year later, he was conferred the degree of Doctor of Law from Geneva College, New York. Davies had chosen to retire to devote more time in writing textbooks. After a brief teaching stint at the Normal School in Albany, New York, he accepted a position at Columbia College, New York City in 1857 and was appointed as emeritus professor in 1865.

He died on September 17, 1878. He was engaged with authoring textbooks till his death. He was buried in the family cemetery at Oswegatchie, New York.

== Works ==
Charles Davies' books were published by A.S. Barnes & Co. His earliest works were translations of French authors. But according to author John H. Lienhard, those books were based only very loosely upon the original French works. Elements of Geometry and Trigonometry (1828), his most popular work, appeared in 33 editions/printings and sold more than 300,000 copies. By 1875, his publisher had sold over 7,000,000 copies of his books and was selling 350,000 copies every year.

Mathematical historian Florian Cajori wrote of his books as being "perspicuous, clear, and logically arranged."

The following works by Davies were used as textbooks at West Point:

- Elements of Descriptive Geometry, with Their Application to Spherical Trigonometry, Spherical Projections, and Warped Surfaces (1826); 1866 edition
- Elements of Geometry and Trigonometry (1828), translated from the French of A. M. Legendre, by David Brewster. Revised and Adapted to the Course of Instruction in the United States.
- Elements of Surveying (1830)
- A Treatise on Shades and Shadows, and Linear Perspective (1832)
- Common School Arithmetic (1833)
- Elements of Algebra (1835), translated from the French Élémens d'algèbre of M. Pierre Louis Marie Bourdon
- Elements of the Differential and Integral Calculus (1836)
- Elements of Analytical Geometry (1837); 1845 revised edition
