= David Tall =

Professor of Mathematical Thinking

David Orme Tall
- Born: 15 May 1941; Finedon, Northamptonshire, United Kingdom
- Died: 15 July 2024 (aged 83); Warwick, Warwickshire, United Kingdom
- Education: Wadham College, Oxford; University of Oxford
- Occupation: Professor of Mathematical Thinking,
- Spouse: Susan Tall (née Ford) (m. 1963)
- Children: 4
- Scientific career
- Fields: Mathematics; Mathematics education

David Orme Tall (1941-2024) was an Emeritus Professor in Mathematical Thinking at the University of Warwick. One of his early influential works is the joint paper with Vinner "Concept image and concept definition in mathematics with particular reference to limits and continuity". The "concept image" is a notion in cognitive theory. It consists of all the cognitive structure in the individual's mind that is associated with a given concept. Tall and Vinner point out that the concept image may not be globally coherent, and may have aspects which are quite different from the formal concept definition. They study the development of limits and continuity, as taught in secondary school and university, from the cognitive viewpoint, and report on investigations which exhibit individual concept images differing from the formal theory, and containing factors which cause cognitive conflict.

Tall was also known within mathematics education for his longstanding collaboration with Eddie Gray. This partnership, based at the Mathematics Education Research Centre at the University of Warwick, resulted in the theoretically important notion of procept. Gray and Tall (1994) noted that mathematical symbolism often ambiguously refers to both process and concept, and that successful learners must be able to flexibly move between these different interpretations.

In recent years Tall has been working on what he calls 'three fundamentally different ways of operation' in mathematics, 'one through physical embodiment, including physical action and the use of visual and other senses, a second through the use of mathematical symbols that operate as process and concept (procepts) in arithmetic, algebra and symbolic calculus, and a third through formal mathematics in advanced mathematical thinking'. These three ways have become known as Tall's Three Worlds of Mathematics: (conceptual) embodied; (operational) symbolic; and, (axiomatic) formal (see http://www.warwick.ac.uk/staff/David.Tall/themes/three-worlds.html) and his book How Humans Learn to Think Mathematically.

In the book commissioned by the International Group for the Psychology of Mathematics Education to review mathematics education research between 1976–2006, Tall was revealed to be the most cited mathematics education researcher in the book, with 55 cites to his name (Gutiérrez & Boero, 2006).

In his 2011 article "Crystalline Concepts in Long-Term Mathematical Invention and Discovery", Tall coined the phrase crystalline concept to describe a mathematical concept with an internally constrained structure of necessary relationships, applying this idea to mathematical thinking developed through the perception of shapes and space, through operations and symbols in arithmetic and algebra, and through axiomatic definitions and proofs. On this account, mathematical concepts are constructed through human thought, but their interrelated properties can still appear inevitable and independent of any particular thinker. Tall cites the view of mathematician Christopher Zeeman, in particular, that mathematical work involves both invention and the discovery of unexpected results, and does not regard this apparent independence as requiring the existence of a separate Platonic mathematical realm.

== Personal life ==
David Tall attended Wellingborough Grammar School (1952-1960) where he developed his life-long interests in music and mathematics. At age 18, he won an open scholarship to Oxford, obtaining a first-class honours degree in mathematics and the Junior Mathematics Prize. His first doctorate, a DPhil in mathematics at Oxford, with supervisor Professor Michael Atiyah, was awarded for work on "The Topology of Group Representations."

His leisure interests included rugby, classical music and orchestras. He formed the Meryfield Choral Society and played in the Wadham College Orchestra, going on to conduct the Oxford City Operatic Society in Die Fledermaus. He was appointed lecturer in Mathematics at Sussex University in 1966, where he wrote his first text book Functions of a Complex Variable and formed his own 'A Capella Choir and Orchestra'.

A move to Warwick University in 1969 as a Lecturer in Mathematics (with special interests in Education) gave him more time to write textbooks with Ian Stewart, and in 1976 when the Coventry College of Education became part of the University of Warwick he began empirical research into students learning mathematics. He transferred to work in the Mathematics Education Research Centre in 1979 and became professionally qualified as a classroom teacher, and gained a second doctorate in education.

Alongside his academic work, his love of music continued and he conducted the Leamington Spa Opera Group from 1969-1976, expanded a small madrigal group at University of Warwick into the Choro dei Cantori, became musical director of the Blue Triangle Operatic Society and for the Talisman Theatre Palace of Varieties. In 1972 he was invited to be the Principal Conductor of the Beauchamp Sinfonietta and conducted over 50 classical concerts.

All his life he particularly loved the music of Frederick Delius, Percy Grainger and George Gershwin. He formed the Percy Grainger Society in 1977 and held the position of chairman for 5 years. In 1991 he was awarded the Bronze Medallion of the International Percy Grainger Society (New York) for scholarship and services to the music of Percy Grainger.

From the 1970s he travelled abroad extensively to give seminars and plenaries at mathematics education conferences around the world. He was also a member of the Rotary Club of Kenilworth for 48 years, becoming president in 1983/84. He retired in 2006 while remaining linked to the University of Warwick as a Professor Emeritus in Mathematical Thinking and was still writing and publishing papers until shortly before his death.

== Bibliography ==
- Advanced mathematical thinking. Edited by David Tall. Mathematics Education Library, 11. Kluwer Academic Publishers Group, Dordrecht, 1991.
- Stewart, Ian and Tall, David: Algebraic number theory. Second edition. Chapman and Hall Mathematics Series. Chapman & Hall, London, 1987. xx+262 pp. ISBN 041229690X
- Stewart, Ian and Tall, David: Algebraic number theory. Chapman and Hall Mathematics Series. Chapman and Hall, London; A Halsted Press Book, John Wiley & Sons, New York, 1979. xviii+257 pp. ISBN 0-470-26660-0
- Stewart, Ian and Tall, David: Algebraic number theory and Fermat's last theorem. Third edition. A K Peters, Ltd., Natick, MA, 2002. xx+313 pp. ISBN 1-56881-119-5
- Stewart, Ian and Tall, David: Complex analysis. The hitchhiker's guide to the plane. Cambridge University Press, Cambridge-New York, 1983. ix+290 pp. ISBN 0-521-24513-3, ISBN 0-521-28763-4
- Tall, David: (2013). How Humans Learn to Think Mathematically: Exploring the Three Worlds of Mathematics (Learning in Doing: Social, Cognitive and Computational Perspectives). Cambridge: Cambridge University Press. doi:10.1017/CBO9781139565202

== See also ==
- Criticism of non-standard analysis
