= The Mathematics Educator =

- Discipline: Mathematics education
- Language: English
- Edited by: Jennifer Kleiman and Sohei Yasuda

Publication details
- History: 1990 - present
- Publisher: University of Georgia (United States)
- Frequency: 2 annual issues

Standard abbreviations
- ISO 4: Math. Educ.

Indexing
- ISSN: 1062-9017

Links
- Journal homepage

The Mathematics Educator (TME) is a peer-reviewed journal within the field of mathematics education. TME is produced by students, and it is published by the Mathematics Education Student Association (MESA) in the Department of Mathematics Education at the University of Georgia. MESA is an affiliate of the National Council of Teachers of Mathematics (NCTM).

The journal first appeared in 1990, and it has appeared one or two times a year since then. It welcomes different types of manuscripts, like research reports, commentaries, literature reviews, theoretical articles, and critiques.

== See also ==
- List of scientific journals in mathematics education
