= Herbert Enderton =

American mathematician (1936–2010)

Herbert B. Enderton
- Born: Herbert Bruce Enderton; April 15, 1936
- Died: October 20, 2010 (aged 74); Santa Monica, California, U.S.
- Education: Harvard University
- Scientific career
- Fields: Mathematical Logic
- Workplaces: UCLA

Herbert Bruce Enderton (April 15, 1936 – October 20, 2010) was an American mathematician. He was a Professor Emeritus of Mathematics at UCLA and a former member of the faculties of Mathematics and of Logic and the Methodology of Science at the University of California, Berkeley.

Enderton also contributed to recursion theory, the theory of definability, models of analysis, computational complexity, and the history of logic.

He earned his Ph.D. at Harvard in 1962. He was a member of the American Mathematical Society from 1961 until his death.

== Personal life ==
He lived in Santa Monica. He married his wife, Cathy, in 1961 and they had two sons; Eric and Bert.

== Death ==
He died from leukemia in 2010.

== Selected publications ==
- Elements of Set Theory. Academic Press. 1977. ISBN 978-0-12-238440-0.
- A Mathematical Introduction to Logic. Academic Press. 1972. ISBN 978-0-12-238452-3.
- Computability Theory: An Introduction to Recursion Theory. Academic Press. 2011. ISBN 978-0-12-384958-8.
