= Hyperinteger =

Hyperreal number that is equal to its own integer part

In nonstandard analysis, a hyperinteger n is a hyperreal number that is equal to its own integer part. A hyperinteger may be either finite or infinite. A finite hyperinteger is an ordinary integer. An example of an infinite hyperinteger is given by the class of the sequence (1, 2, 3, ...) in the ultrapower construction of the hyperreals.

== Discussion ==
The standard integer part function:

$$\lfloor x \rfloor$$

is defined for all real x and equals the greatest integer not exceeding x. By the transfer principle of nonstandard analysis, there exists a natural extension:

$${}^*\! \lfloor \,\cdot\, \rfloor$$

defined for all hyperreal x, and we say that x is a hyperinteger if $x = {}^*\! \lfloor x \rfloor.$ Thus, the hyperintegers are the image of the integer part function on the hyperreals.

== Internal sets ==
The set $^*\mathbb{Z}$ of all hyperintegers is an internal subset of the hyperreal line $^*\mathbb{R}$. The set of all finite hyperintegers (i.e. $\mathbb{Z}$ itself) is not an internal subset. Elements of the complement $^*\mathbb{Z}\setminus\mathbb{Z}$ are called, depending on the author, nonstandard, unlimited, or infinite hyperintegers. The reciprocal of an infinite hyperinteger is always an infinitesimal.

Nonnegative hyperintegers are sometimes called hypernatural numbers. Similar remarks apply to the sets $\mathbb{N}$ and $^*\mathbb{N}$. Note that the latter gives a non-standard model of arithmetic in the sense of Skolem.
