= Cours d'analyse =

Textbook by Augustin-Louis Cauchy (1821)

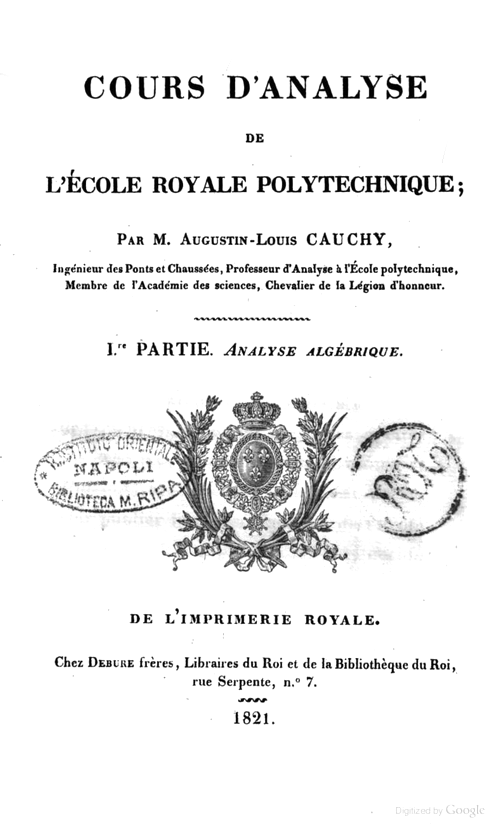
- Title page
- Author: Augustin-Louis Cauchy
- Original title: Cours d'analyse de l’École royale polytechnique; I.re Partie. Analyse algébrique
- Language: French
- Subject: Calculus
- Publisher: Debure frères
- Publication date: 1821
- Publication place: Paris, France

Cours d'analyse de l’École royale polytechnique; I.re Partie. Analyse algébrique ("Analysis Course" in English) is a seminal textbook in infinitesimal calculus published by Augustin-Louis Cauchy in 1821. The article follows the translation by Bradley and Sandifer in describing its contents.

== Introduction ==
On page 1 of the Introduction, Cauchy writes: "In speaking of the continuity of functions, I could not dispense with a treatment of the principal properties of infinitely small quantities, properties which serve as the foundation of the infinitesimal calculus." The translators comment in a footnote: "It is interesting that Cauchy does not also mention limits here."

Cauchy continues: "As for the methods, I have sought to give them all the rigor which one demands from geometry, so that one need never rely on arguments drawn from the generality of algebra."

== Preliminaries ==
On page 6, Cauchy first discusses variable quantities and then introduces the limit notion in the following terms: "When the values successively attributed to a particular variable indefinitely approach a fixed value in such a way as to end up by differing from it by as little as we wish, this fixed value is called the limit of all the other values."

On page 7, Cauchy defines an infinitesimal as follows: "When the successive numerical values of such a variable decrease indefinitely, in such a way as to fall below any given number, this variable becomes what we call infinitesimal, or an infinitely small quantity." Cauchy adds: "A variable of this kind has zero as its limit."

On page 10, Bradley and Sandifer confuse the versed cosine with the coversed sine. Cauchy originally defined the sinus versus (versine) as siv(θ) = 1 − cos(θ) and the cosinus versus (what is now also known as coversine) as cosiv(θ) = 1 − sin(θ). In the translation, however, the cosinus versus (and cosiv) are incorrectly associated with the versed cosine (what is now also known as vercosine) rather than the coversed sine.

The notation

lim

is introduced on page 12. The translators observe in a footnote: "The notation “Lim.” for limit was first used by Simon Antoine Jean L'Huilier (1750–1840) in [L’Huilier 1787, p. 31]. Cauchy wrote this as “lim.” in [Cauchy 1821, p. 13]. The period had disappeared by [Cauchy 1897, p. 26]."

== Chapter 2 ==
This chapter has the long title "On infinitely small and infinitely large quantities, and on the continuity of functions. Singular values of functions in various particular cases." On page 21, Cauchy writes: "We say that a variable quantity becomes infinitely small when its numerical value decreases indefinitely in such a way as to converge towards the limit zero." On the same page, we find the only explicit example of such a variable to be found in Cauchy, namely

$$\frac{1}{4}, \frac{1}{3},\frac{1}{6}, \frac{1}{5}, \frac{1}{8}, \frac{1}{7}, \ldots$$

On page 22, Cauchy starts the discussion of orders of magnitude of infinitesimals as follows: "Let $\alpha$ be an infinitely small quantity, that is a variable whose numerical value decreases indefinitely. When the various integer powers of $\alpha$, namely
$$\alpha, \alpha^2, \alpha^3, \ldots$$
enter into the same calculation, these various powers are called, respectively, infinitely small of the first, the second, the third order, etc. Cauchy notes that "the general form of infinitely small quantities of order n (where n represents an integer number) will be

$k\alpha^n\quad{}$ or at least ${}\quad k\alpha^n(1\pm \varepsilon)$.

On pages 23-25, Cauchy presents eight theorems on properties of infinitesimals of various orders.

== Section 2.2 ==
This section is entitled "Continuity of functions". Cauchy writes: "If, beginning with a value of x contained between these limits, we add to the variable x an infinitely small increment $\alpha$, the function itself is incremented by the difference

$f(x+\alpha)-f(x)$"

and states that

"the function f(x) is a continuous function of x between the assigned limits if, for each value of x between these limits, the numerical value of the difference $f(x+\alpha)-f(x)$ decreases indefinitely with the numerical value of $\alpha$."

Cauchy goes on to provide an italicized definition of continuity in the following terms:

"the function f(x) is continuous with respect to x between the given limits if, between these limits, an infinitely small increment in the variable always produces an infinitely small increment in the function itself."

On page 32 Cauchy states the intermediate value theorem.

== Sum theorem ==
In Theorem I in section 6.1 (page 90 in the translation by Bradley and Sandifer), Cauchy presents the sum theorem in the following terms.

When the various terms of series (1) are functions of the same variable x, continuous with respect to this variable in the neighborhood of a particular value for which the series converges, the sum s of the series is also a continuous function of x in the neighborhood of this particular value.

Here the series (1) appears on page 86: (1) $u_0, u_1, u_2, \ldots, u_n, u_{n+1},\ldots$

== Bibliography ==
- Cauchy, Augustin-Louis (1821). Cours d'analyse de l'Ecole royale polytechnique. Paris: L'Imprimerie Royale, Debure frères, Libraires du Roi et de la Bibliothèque du Roi.
- Bradley, Robert E.; Sandifer, C. Edward (2009). Cauchy's Cours d'analyse: An Annotated Translation. Cauchy, Augustin-Louis. New York: Springer. doi:10.1007/978-1-4419-0549-9. ISBN 978-1-4419-0548-2.
- Grabiner, Judith V. (1981). The Origins of Cauchy's Rigorous Calculus. Cambridge: MIT Press. ISBN 0-387-90527-8.
