= For the Learning of Mathematics =

- Discipline: Mathematics education
- Language: English, French
- Edited by: David Reid

Publication details
- History: 1981–present
- Publisher: FLM Publishing Association (Canada)
- Frequency: Triannually
- Open access: Delayed, after 3 years

Standard abbreviations
- ISO 4: For Learn. Math.

Indexing
- ISSN: 0228-0671
- LCCN: 81649515
- JSTOR: 02280671
- OCLC no.: 732868199

Links
- Journal homepage

For the Learning of Mathematics is a triannual peer-reviewed academic journal covering mathematics education. It was established in 1981 by David Wheeler.

== Abstracting and indexing ==
The journal is abstracted and indexed in:

- EBSCO databases
- Education Resources Information Center
- Index Islamicus
- ProQuest databases
- Scopus

== Reception ==
In 2012, a survey of researchers in the field ranked the journal with an A (the second highest ranking, below A*). In 2017, another ranking of journals placed it in the top tier. At the same time, the high ranking in both of these reviews was questioned, suggesting that the journal more properly belongs in the mid-tier.

== Editors-in-chief ==
The following persons are or have been editor-in-chief:

- David Wheeler (1981–1996)
- David Pimm (1997–2002)
- Laurinda Brown (2003–2007)
- Brent Davis (2008–2010)
- Richard Barwell (2011–2016)
- David Reid (2017–present)

== See also ==
- List of mathematics education journals
