= Educational Studies in Mathematics =

Academic journal on mathematics education

- Discipline: Mathematics education
- Language: English
- Edited by: Susanne Prediger, David Wagner

Publication details
- History: 1968–present
- Publisher: Springer Science+Business Media
- Frequency: 9/year
- Impact factor: 2.402 (2020)

Standard abbreviations
- ISO 4: Educ. Stud. Math.

Indexing
- ISSN: 0013-1954 (print); 1573-0816 (web)
- LCCN: 68007390
- OCLC no.: 793945846

Links
- Journal homepage; Online archive

Educational Studies in Mathematics is a peer-reviewed academic journal covering mathematics education. It was established by Hans Freudenthal in 1968. The journal is published by Springer Science+Business Media and the editors-in-chief are Vilma Mesa (University of Michigan) and David Wagner (University of New Brunswick). According to the Journal Citation Reports, the journal has a 2020 impact factor of 2.402.

== Editors-in-chief ==
The following persons are or have been editors-in-chief:

- 1968-1977: Hans Freudenthal
- 1978-1989: Alan Bishop
- 1990-1995: Willibald Dörfler
- 1996-2000: Kenneth Ruthven
- 2001-2005: Anna Sierpińska
- 2006-2008: Tommy Dreyfus
- 2009-2013: Norma Presmeg
- 2014-2018: Merrilyn Goos
- 2019-2020: Arthur Bakker
- 2021-2022: Arthur Bakker and David Wagner
- 2022-2025: Susanne Prediger and David Wagner
- 2025-present: Vilma Mesa and David Wagner

== See also ==
- List of mathematics education journals
