= Least-upper-bound property =

Property of a partially ordered set

Every non-empty subset $M$ of the real numbers $\mathbb{R}$ which is bounded from above has a least upper bound.

In mathematics, the least-upper-bound property (sometimes called completeness, supremum property or l.u.b. property) is a fundamental property of the real numbers. More generally, a partially ordered set X has the least-upper-bound property if every non-empty subset of X with an upper bound has a least upper bound (supremum) in X. Not every (partially) ordered set has the least upper bound property. For example, the set $\mathbb{Q}$ of all rational numbers with its natural order does not have the least upper bound property.

The least-upper-bound property is one form of the completeness axiom for the real numbers, and is sometimes referred to as Dedekind completeness. It can be used to prove many of the fundamental results of real analysis, such as the intermediate value theorem, the Bolzano–Weierstrass theorem, the extreme value theorem, and the Heine–Borel theorem. It is usually taken as an axiom in synthetic constructions of the real numbers, and it is also intimately related to the construction of the real numbers using Dedekind cuts.

In order theory, this property can be generalized to a notion of completeness for any partially ordered set. A linearly ordered set that is dense and has the least upper bound property is called a linear continuum.

== Statement of the property ==
=== Statement for real numbers ===
Let S be a non-empty set of real numbers.

- A real number x is called an upper bound for S if x ≥ s for all s ∈ S.
- A real number x is the least upper bound (or supremum) for S if x is an upper bound for S and x ≤ y for every upper bound y of S.

The least-upper-bound property states that any non-empty set of real numbers that has an upper bound must have a least upper bound in real numbers.

=== Generalization to ordered sets ===
Red: the set $\left\{ x \in \mathbf{Q} : x^2 \le 2 \right\}$. Blue: the set of its upper bounds in $\mathbf{Q}$.

More generally, one may define upper bound and least upper bound for any subset of a partially ordered set X, with “real number” replaced by “element of X”. In this case, we say that X has the least-upper-bound property if every non-empty subset of X with an upper bound has a least upper bound in X.

For example, the set Q of rational numbers does not have the least-upper-bound property under the usual order. For instance, the set

$$\left\{ x \in \mathbf{Q} : x^2 \le 2 \right\} = \mathbf{Q} \cap \left(-\sqrt{2}, \sqrt{2}\right)$$

has an upper bound in Q, but does not have a least upper bound in Q (since the square root of two is irrational). The construction of the real numbers using Dedekind cuts takes advantage of this failure by defining the irrational numbers as the least upper bounds of certain subsets of the rationals.

== Proof ==
=== Logical status ===
For the real numbers, the least-upper-bound property is equivalent to other forms of the completeness axiom, such as the convergence of Cauchy sequences or the nested intervals theorem. The logical status of the property depends on the construction of the real numbers used: in a synthetic approach, the property is usually taken as an axiom; in other approaches, the property must be proved as a theorem, either directly from the construction or as a consequence of some other form of completeness.

=== Proof using Cauchy sequences ===
The least-upper-bound property can be proved from the Archimedean property together with the assumption that every Cauchy sequence of real numbers converges. Let S be a nonempty set of real numbers. If S has exactly one element, then its only element is a least upper bound. So consider S with more than one element, and suppose that S has an upper bound B_{1}. Since S is nonempty and has more than one element, there exists a real number A_{1} that is not an upper bound for S. Define sequences A_{1}, A_{2}, A_{3}, ... and B_{1}, B_{2}, B_{3}, ... recursively as follows:

1. Check whether (A_{n} + B_{n}) / 2 is an upper bound for S.
2. If it is, let A_{n+1} = A_{n} and let B_{n+1} = (A_{n} + B_{n}) / 2.
3. Otherwise there must be an element s in S so that s>(A_{n} + B_{n}) / 2. Let A_{n+1} = s and let B_{n+1} = B_{n}.

Then A_{1} ≤ A_{2} ≤ A_{3} ≤ ⋯ ≤ B_{3} ≤ B_{2} ≤ B_{1}. Now |A_{n} − B_{n}| → 0 as n → ∞, by the Archimedean property. It follows that both sequences are Cauchy and have the same limit L, which must be the least upper bound for S.

== Applications ==
The least-upper-bound property of R can be used to prove many of the main foundational theorems in real analysis.

=== Intermediate value theorem ===
Let f : [a, b] → R be a continuous function, and suppose that f (a) < 0 and f (b) > 0. In this case, the intermediate value theorem states that f must have a root in the interval [a, b]. This theorem can be proved by considering the set

S = {s ∈ [a, b] : f (x) < 0 for all x ≤ s} .

That is, S is the initial segment of [a, b] that takes negative values under f. Then b is an upper bound for S, and the least upper bound must be a root of f.

=== Bolzano–Weierstrass theorem ===
The Bolzano–Weierstrass theorem for R states that every sequence x_{n} of real numbers in a closed interval [a, b] must have a convergent subsequence. This theorem can be proved by considering the set

S = {s ∈ [a, b] : s ≤ x_{n} for infinitely many n}

Clearly, $a\in S$, and S is not empty. In addition, b is an upper bound for S, so S has a least upper bound c. Then c must be a limit point of the sequence x_{n}, and it follows that x_{n} has a subsequence that converges to c.

=== Extreme value theorem ===
Let f : [a, b] → R be a continuous function and let M = sup f ([a, b]), where M = ∞ if f ([a, b]) has no upper bound. The extreme value theorem states that M is finite and f (c) = M for some c ∈ [a, b]. This can be proved by considering the set

S = {s ∈ [a, b] : sup f ([s, b]) = M} .

By definition of M, a ∈ S, and by its own definition, S is bounded by b. If c is the least upper bound of S, then it follows from continuity that f (c) = M.

=== Heine–Borel theorem ===
Let [a, b] be a closed interval in R, and let {U_{α}} be a collection of open sets that covers [a, b]. Then the Heine–Borel theorem states that some finite subcollection of {U_{α}} covers [a, b] as well. This statement can be proved by considering the set

S = {s ∈ [a, b] : [a, s] can be covered by finitely many U_{α}} .

The set S obviously contains a, and is bounded by b by construction. By the least-upper-bound property, S has a least upper bound c ∈ [a, b]. Hence, c is itself an element of some open set U_{α}, and it follows for c < b that [a, c + δ] can be covered by finitely many U_{α} for some sufficiently small δ > 0. This proves that c + δ ∈ S and c is not an upper bound for S. Consequently, c = b.

== History ==
The importance of the least-upper-bound property was first recognized by Bernard Bolzano in his 1817 paper Rein analytischer Beweis des Lehrsatzes dass zwischen je zwey Werthen, die ein entgegengesetztes Resultat gewähren, wenigstens eine reelle Wurzel der Gleichung liege.

== See also ==
- List of real analysis topics
