= Completeness of the real numbers =

Nonexistence of gaps in the number line

Completeness is a property of the real numbers that, intuitively, implies that there are no "gaps" (in Dedekind's terminology) or "missing points" in the real number line. This contrasts with the rational numbers, whose corresponding number line has a "gap" at each irrational value. In the decimal number system, completeness is equivalent to the statement that any infinite string of decimal digits is actually a decimal representation for some real number.

Depending on the construction of the real numbers used, completeness may take the form of an axiom (the completeness axiom), or may be a theorem proven from the construction. There are many forms of completeness, the most prominent being Dedekind completeness and Cauchy completeness (completeness as a metric space). Depending on which other properties are assumed, Dedekind completeness and Cauchy completeness may be equivalent properties, or Dedekind completeness may be a stronger property than Cauchy completeness.

== Forms of completeness ==
The real numbers can be defined synthetically as an ordered field satisfying some version of the completeness axiom. Different versions of this axiom are all equivalent in the sense that any ordered field that satisfies one form of completeness satisfies all of them, apart from Cauchy completeness and nested intervals theorem, which are strictly weaker in that there are non Archimedean fields that are ordered and Cauchy complete. When the real numbers are instead constructed using a model, completeness becomes a theorem or collection of theorems.

=== Least upper bound property ===
The least-upper-bound property states that every nonempty subset of real numbers having an upper bound (or bounded above) must have a least upper bound (or supremum) in the set of real numbers.

The rational number line Q does not have the least upper bound property. An example is the subset of rational numbers

$$S = \{ x\in \Q \mid x^2 < 2\}.$$

This set has an upper bound. However, this set has no least upper bound in Q: the least upper bound as a subset of the reals would be √2, but it does not exist in Q. For any upper bound x ∈ Q, there is another upper bound y ∈ Q with y < x.

For instance, take x = 1.5, then x is certainly an upper bound of S, since x is positive and x^{2} = 2.25 ≥ 2; that is, no element of S is larger than x. However, we can choose a smaller upper bound, say y = 1.45; this is also an upper bound of S for the same reasons, but it is smaller than x, so x is not a least-upper-bound of S. We can proceed similarly to find an upper bound of S that is smaller than y, say z = 1.42, etc., such that we never find a least-upper-bound of S in Q.

The least upper bound property can be generalized to the setting of partially ordered sets. See completeness (order theory).

=== Dedekind completeness ===
Dedekind completeness is the property that every Dedekind cut of the real numbers is generated by a real number. In a synthetic approach to the real numbers, this is the version of completeness that is most often included as an axiom.

The rational number line Q is not Dedekind complete. An example is the Dedekind cut

$$L = \{ x \in \Q \mid x^2 \le 2 \vee x < 0\}.$$
$$R = \{ x \in \Q \mid x^2 \ge 2 \wedge x > 0 \}.$$

L does not have a maximum and R does not have a minimum, so this cut is not generated by a rational number.

There is a construction of the real numbers based on the idea of using Dedekind cuts of rational numbers to name real numbers; e.g. the cut (L,R) described above would name $\sqrt{2}$. If one were to repeat the construction of real numbers with Dedekind cuts (i.e., "close" the set of real numbers by adding all possible Dedekind cuts), one would obtain no additional numbers because the real numbers are already Dedekind complete.

=== Cauchy completeness ===
Cauchy completeness is the statement that every Cauchy sequence of real numbers converges to a real number.

The rational number line Q is not Cauchy complete. An example is the following sequence of rational numbers:

$$3,\quad 3.1,\quad 3.14,\quad 3.141,\quad 3.1415,\quad \ldots$$

Here the nth term in the sequence is the nth decimal approximation for pi. Though this is a Cauchy sequence of rational numbers, it does not converge to any rational number. (In this real number line, this sequence converges to pi.)

Cauchy completeness is related to the construction of the real numbers using Cauchy sequences. Essentially, this method defines a real number to be the limit of a Cauchy sequence of rational numbers.

In mathematical analysis, Cauchy completeness can be generalized to a notion of completeness for any metric space. See complete metric space.

For an ordered field, Cauchy completeness is weaker than the other forms of completeness on this page. But Cauchy completeness and the Archimedean property taken together are equivalent to the others.

=== Nested intervals theorem ===
The nested interval theorem is another form of completeness. Let I_{n} = [a_{n}, b_{n}] be a sequence of non-empty closed intervals, and suppose that for all $n\in\mathbb{N}$, $I_{n+1}\subseteq I_{n}$. Moreover, assume that b_{n} − a_{n} → 0 as n → +∞. The nested interval theorem states that the intersection of all of the intervals I_{n} contains exactly one point.

For any ordered field $F$, such as the rational numbers, we can define an interval $[a, b]$ to be

$$[a, b]_F = \{ x \in F\ |\ a \leq x \leq b \}.$$

We can therefore consider the question of whether (the natural generalization of) the nested intervals property holds for ordered fields other than the real numbers.

The answer turns out to be no. For example, the rational numbers $\mathbb{Q}$ do not satisfy the nested interval property. The sequence (whose terms are derived from the digits of pi in the suggested way)

$$[3,4]_\mathbb{Q} \;\supset\; [3.1,3.2]_\mathbb{Q} \;\supset\; [3.14,3.15]_\mathbb{Q} \;\supset\; [3.141,3.142]_\mathbb{Q} \;\supset\; \cdots$$

is a nested sequence of closed intervals in the rational numbers whose intersection is empty. (In the real numbers, the intersection of these intervals contains the number pi.)

Nested intervals theorem shares the same logical status as Cauchy completeness in this spectrum of expressions of completeness. In other words, nested intervals theorem by itself is weaker than other forms of completeness, although taken together with Archimedean property, it is equivalent to the others.

=== The open induction principle ===
The open induction principle states that a non-empty open subset $S$ of the interval $[a,b]$ must be equal to the entire interval, if for any $r \in [a,b]$, we have that $[a,r) \subset S$ implies $[a,r] \subset S$.

The open induction principle can be shown to be equivalent to Dedekind completeness for arbitrary ordered sets under the order topology, using proofs by contradiction. In weaker foundations such as in constructive analysis where the law of the excluded middle does not hold, the full form of the least upper bound property fails for the Dedekind reals, while the open induction property remains true in most models (following from Brouwer's bar theorem) and is strong enough to give short proofs of key theorems.

=== Monotone convergence theorem ===
The monotone convergence theorem (described as the fundamental axiom of analysis by Körner) states that every nondecreasing, bounded sequence of real numbers converges. This can be viewed as a special case of the least upper bound property, but it can also be used fairly directly to prove the Cauchy completeness of the real numbers.

=== Bolzano–Weierstrass theorem ===
The Bolzano–Weierstrass theorem states that every bounded sequence of real numbers has a convergent subsequence. Again, this theorem is equivalent to the other forms of completeness given above.

=== The intermediate value theorem ===
The intermediate value theorem states that every continuous function that attains both negative and positive values has a root. This is a consequence of the least upper bound property, but it can also be used to prove the least upper bound property if treated as an axiom. (The definition of continuity does not depend on any form of completeness, so there is no circularity: what is meant is that the intermediate value theorem and the least upper bound property are equivalent statements.)

== See also ==
- List of real analysis topics
