= Extreme value theorem =

Continuous real function on a closed interval has a maximum and a minimum

A continuous function $f$ on the closed interval $[a, b]$ showing the absolute max (red) and the absolute min (blue).

In real analysis, the extreme value theorem states that if a real-valued function $f$ is continuous on the closed and bounded interval $[a,b]$, then $f$ must attain a maximum and a minimum, each at least once. That is, there exist numbers $c$ and $d$ in $[a,b]$ such that:
$$f(d) \leq f(x) \leq f(c)\quad \forall x\in [a,b].$$

The extreme value theorem is more specific than the related boundedness theorem, which states merely that a continuous function $f$ on the closed interval $[a,b]$ is bounded on that interval; that is, there exist real numbers $m$ and $M$ such that:
$$m \le f(x) \le M\quad \forall x \in [a, b].$$

This does not say that $M$ and $m$ are necessarily the maximum and minimum values of $f$ on the interval $[a,b],$ which is what the extreme value theorem stipulates must also be the case.

The extreme value theorem is used to prove Rolle's theorem. In a formulation due to Karl Weierstrass, this theorem states that a continuous function from a non-empty compact space to a subset of the real numbers attains a maximum and a minimum.

== History ==
The extreme value theorem was originally proven by Bernard Bolzano in the 1830s in a work Function Theory but the work remained unpublished until 1930. Bolzano's proof consisted of showing that a continuous function on a closed interval was bounded, and then showing that the function attained a maximum and a minimum value. Both proofs involved what is known today as the Bolzano–Weierstrass theorem.

== Functions to which the theorem does not apply ==
The following examples show why the function domain must be closed and bounded in order for the theorem to apply. Each fails to attain a maximum on the given interval.

1. $f(x)=x$ defined over $[0, \infty)$ is not bounded from above.
2. $f(x)= \frac{x}{1+x}$ defined over $[0, \infty)$ is bounded from below but does not attain its least upper bound $1$.
3. $f(x)= \frac{1}{x}$ defined over $(0,1]$ is not bounded from above.
4. $f(x) = 1-x$ defined over $(0,1]$ is bounded but never attains its least upper bound $1$.

Defining $f(0)=0$ in the last two examples shows that both theorems require continuity on $[a,b]$.

== Generalization to metric and topological spaces ==
When moving from the real line $\mathbb{R}$ to metric spaces and general topological spaces, the appropriate generalization of a closed bounded interval is a compact set. A set $K$ is said to be compact if it has the following property: from every collection of open sets $U_\alpha$ such that $\bigcup U_\alpha \supset K$, a finite subcollection $U_{\alpha_1},\ldots,U_{\alpha_n}$can be chosen such that $\bigcup_{i=1}^n U_{\alpha_i} \supset K$. This is usually stated in short as "every open cover of $K$ has a finite subcover". The Heine–Borel theorem asserts that a subset of the real line is compact if and only if it is both closed and bounded. Correspondingly, a metric space has the Heine–Borel property if every closed and bounded set is also compact.

The concept of a continuous function can likewise be generalized. Given topological spaces $V,\ W$, a function $f:V\to W$ is said to be continuous if for every open set $U\subset W$, $f^{-1}(U)\subset V$ is also open. Given these definitions, continuous functions can be shown to preserve compactness:

Theorem—If $V,\ W$ are topological spaces, $f:V\to W$ is a continuous function, and $K\subset V$ is compact, then $f(K)\subset W$ is also compact.

In particular, if $W = \mathbb{R}$, then this theorem implies that $f(K)$ is closed and bounded for any compact set $K$, which in turn implies that $f$ attains its supremum and infimum on any (nonempty) compact set $K$. Thus, we have the following generalization of the extreme value theorem:

Theorem—If $K$ is a nonempty compact set and $f:K\to \mathbb{R}$ is a continuous function, then $f$ is bounded and there exist $p,q\in K$ such that $f(p)=\sup_{x\in K} f(x)$ and $f(q) = \inf_{x\in K} f(x)$.

Slightly more generally, this is also true for an upper semicontinuous function. (see compact space#Functions and compact spaces).

== Proving the theorems ==
We look at the proof for the upper bound and the maximum of $f$. By applying these results to the function $-f$, the existence of the lower bound and the result for the minimum of $f$ follows. Also note that everything in the proof is done within the context of the real numbers.

We first prove the boundedness theorem, which is a step in the proof of the extreme value theorem. The basic steps involved in the proof of the extreme value theorem are:

1. Prove the boundedness theorem.
2. Find a sequence so that its image converges to the supremum of $f$.
3. Show that there exists a subsequence that converges to a point in the domain.
4. Use continuity to show that the image of the subsequence converges to the supremum.

=== Proof of the boundedness theorem ===
Boundedness Theorem—If $f(x)$ is continuous on $[a,b],$ then it is bounded on $[a,b].$

Proof

Suppose the function $f$ is not bounded above on the interval $[a,b]$. Pick a sequence $(x_n)_{n \in \mathbb{N}}$ such that $x_n \in [a,b]$ and $f(x_n)>n$. Because $[a,b]$ is bounded, the Bolzano–Weierstrass theorem implies that there exists a convergent subsequence $(x_{n_k})_{k \in \mathbb{N}}$ of $({x_n})$. Denote its limit by $x$. As $[a,b]$ is closed, it contains $x$. Because $f$ is continuous at $x$, we know that $f(x_{{n}_{k}})$ converges to the real number $f(x)$ (as $f$ is sequentially continuous at $x$). But $f(x_{{n}_{k}}) > n_k \geq k$ for every $k$, which implies that $f(x_{{n}_{k}})$ diverges to $+ \infty$, a contradiction. Therefore, $f$ is bounded above on $[a,b]$. ∎

Alternative proof

Consider the set $B$ of points $p$ in $[a,b]$ such that $f(x)$ is bounded on $[a,p]$. We note that $a$ is one such point, for $f(x)$ is bounded on $[a,a]$ by the value $f(a)$. If $e > a$ is another point, then all points between $a$ and $e$ also belong to $B$. In other words, $B$ is an interval closed at its left end by $a$.

Now $f$ is continuous on the right at $a$, hence there exists $\delta>0$ such that $|f(x) - f(a)| < 1$ for all $x$ in $[a,a+\delta]$. Thus $f$ is bounded by $f(a) - 1$ and $f(a)+1$ on the interval $[a,a+\delta]$ so that all these points belong to $B$.

So far, we know that $B$ is an interval of non-zero length, closed at its left end by $a$.

Next, $B$ is bounded above by $b$. Hence, the set $B$ has a supremum in $[a,b]$; let us call it $s$. From the non-zero length of $B$ we can deduce that $s > a$.

Suppose $s<b$. Now $f$ is continuous at $s$, hence there exists $\delta>0$ such that $|f(x) - f(s)| < 1$ for all $x$ in $[s-\delta,s+\delta]$ so that $f$ is bounded on this interval. But it follows from the supremacy of $s$ that there exists a point belonging to $B$, $e$ say, which is greater than $s-\delta/2$. Thus $f$ is bounded on $[a,e]$ which overlaps $[s-\delta,s+\delta]$ so that $f$ is bounded on $[a,s+\delta]$. This, however, contradicts the supremacy of $s$.

We must therefore have $s=b$. Now $f$ is continuous on the left at $s$, hence there exists $\delta>0$ such that $|f(x) - f(s)| < 1$ for all $x$ in $[s-\delta,s]$ so that $f$ is bounded on this interval. But it follows from the supremacy of $s$ that there exists a point belonging to $B$, $e$ say, which is greater than $s-\delta/2$. Thus $f$ is bounded on $[a,e]$ which overlaps $[s-\delta,s]$ so that $f$ is bounded on $[a,s]$. ∎

=== Proofs of the extreme value theorem ===
Proof of the Extreme Value Theorem

By the boundedness theorem, f is bounded from above, hence, by the Dedekind-completeness of the real numbers, the least upper bound (supremum) M of f exists. It is necessary to find a point d in [a, b] such that M = f(d). Let n be a natural number. As M is the least upper bound, M − 1/n is not an upper bound for f. Therefore, there exists d_{n} in [a, b] so that M − 1/n < f(d_{n}). This defines a sequence {d_{n}}. Since M is an upper bound for f, we have M − 1/n < f(d_{n}) ≤ M for all n. Therefore, the sequence {f(d_{n})} converges to M.

The Bolzano–Weierstrass theorem tells us that there exists a subsequence {d_{n_{k}}}, which converges to some d and, as [a, b] is closed, d is in [a, b]. Since f is continuous at d, the sequence {f(d_{n_{k}})} converges to f(d). But {f(d_{n_{k}})} is a subsequence of {f(d_{n})} that converges to M, so M = f(d). Therefore, f attains its supremum M at d. ∎

Alternative Proof of the Extreme Value Theorem

The set {y ∈ R : y = f(x) for some x ∈ [a,b]} is a bounded set. Hence, its least upper bound exists by least upper bound property of the real numbers. Let M = sup(f(x)) on [a, b]. If there is no point x on [a, b] so that f(x) = M, then f(x) < M on [a, b]. Therefore, 1/(M − f(x)) is continuous on [a, b].

However, to every positive number ε, there is always some x in [a, b] such that M − f(x) < ε because M is the least upper bound. Hence, 1/(M − f(x)) > 1/ε, which means that 1/(M − f(x)) is not bounded. Since every continuous function on [a, b] is bounded, this contradicts the conclusion that 1/(M − f(x)) was continuous on [a, b]. Therefore, there must be a point x in [a, b] such that f(x) = M. ∎

=== Proof using the hyperreals ===
Proof

In the setting of non-standard calculus, let N be an infinite hyperinteger. The interval [0, 1] has a natural hyperreal extension. Consider its partition into N subintervals of equal infinitesimal length 1/N, with partition points x_{i} = i /N as i "runs" from 0 to N. The function ƒ is also naturally extended to a function ƒ* defined on the hyperreals between 0 and 1. Note that in the standard setting (when N is finite), a point with the maximal value of ƒ can always be chosen among the N+1 points x_{i}, by induction. Hence, by the transfer principle, there is a hyperinteger i_{0} such that 0 ≤ i_{0} ≤ N and $f^*(x_{i_0})\geq f^*(x_i)$ for all i = 0, ..., N. Consider the real point
$$c = \mathbf{st}(x_{i_0})$$
where st is the standard part function. An arbitrary real point x lies in a suitable sub-interval of the partition, namely $x\in [x_i,x_{i+1}]$, so that st(x_{i}) = x. Applying st to the inequality $f^*(x_{i_0})\geq f^*(x_i)$, we obtain $\mathbf{st}(f^*(x_{i_0}))\geq \mathbf{st}(f^*(x_i))$. By continuity of ƒ we have

$$\mathbf{st}(f^*(x_{i_0}))= f(\mathbf{st}(x_{i_0}))=f(c)$$.

Hence ƒ(c) ≥ ƒ(x), for all real x, proving c to be a maximum of ƒ. ∎

=== Proof from first principles ===
Statement If $f(x)$ is continuous on $[a,b]$ then it attains its supremum on $[a,b]$

Proof

By the Boundedness Theorem, $f(x)$ is bounded above on $[a,b]$ and by the completeness property of the real numbers has a supremum in $[a, b]$. Let us call it $M$, or $M[a,b]$. It is clear that the restriction of $f$ to the subinterval $[a,x]$ where $x\le b$ has a supremum $M[a, x]$ which is less than or equal to $M$, and that $M[a,x]$ increases from $f(a)$ to $M$ as $x$ increases from $a$ to $b$.

If $f(a)=M$ then we are done. Suppose therefore that $f(a)<M$ and let $d=M-f(a)$. Consider the set $L$ of points $x$ in $[a,b]$ such that $M[a,x]< M$.

Clearly $a\in L$ ; moreover if $e>a$ is another point in $L$ then all points between $a$ and $e$ also belong to $L$ because $M[a,x]$ is monotonic increasing. Hence $L$ is a non-empty interval, closed at its left end by $a$.

Now $f$ is continuous on the right at $a$, hence there exists $\delta>0$ such that $|f(x)-f(a)| < d/2$ for all $x$ in $[a,a+\delta]$. Thus $f$ is less than $M-d/2$ on the interval $[a,a+\delta]$ so that all these points belong to $L$.

Next, $L$ is bounded above by $b$ and has therefore a supremum in $[a,b]$: let us call it $s$. We see from the above that $s > a$. We will show that $s$ is the point we are seeking i.e. the point where $f$ attains its supremum, or in other words $f(s)=M$.

Suppose the contrary viz. $f(s)<M$. Let $d=M-f(s)$ and consider the following two cases:

1. $s<b$. As $f$ is continuous at $s$, there exists $\delta>0$ such that $|f(x)-f(s)| < d/2$ for all $x$ in $[s-\delta,s+\delta]$. This means that $f$ is less than $M-d/2$ on the interval $[s-\delta,s+\delta]$. But it follows from the supremacy of $s$ that there exists a point, $e$ say, belonging to $L$ which is greater than $s-\delta$. By the definition of $L$, $M[a,e]< M$. Let $d_1=M-M[a,e]$ then for all $x$ in $[a,e]$, $f(x)\le M-d_1$. Taking $d_2$ to be the minimum of $d/2$ and $d_1$, we have $f(x)\le M-d_2$ for all $x$ in $[a,s+\delta]$.
  Hence $M[a,s+\delta]<M$ so that $s+\delta \in L$. This however contradicts the supremacy of $s$ and completes the proof.
2. $s=b$. As $f$ is continuous on the left at $s$, there exists $\delta>0$ such that $|f(x)-f(s)| < d/2$ for all $x$ in $[s-\delta,s]$. This means that $f$ is less than $M-d/2$ on the interval $[s-\delta,s]$. But it follows from the supremacy of $s$ that there exists a point, $e$ say, belonging to $L$ which is greater than $s-\delta$. By the definition of $L$, $M[a,e]< M$. Let $d_1=M-M[a,e]$ then for all $x$ in $[a,e]$, $f(x)\le M-d_1$. Taking $d_2$ to be the minimum of $d/2$ and $d_1$, we have $f(x)\le M-d_2$ for all $x$ in $[a,b]$. This contradicts the supremacy of $M$ and completes the proof. ∎

== Extension to semi-continuous functions ==
If the continuity of the function f is weakened to semi-continuity, then the corresponding half of the boundedness theorem and the extreme value theorem hold and the values −∞ or +∞, respectively, from the extended real number line can be allowed as possible values.

A function $f : [a, b] \to [-\infty, \infty)$ is said to be upper semi-continuous if
$$\limsup_{y\to x} f(y) \le f(x) \quad \forall x \in [a, b].$$

Theorem—If a function f : [a, b] → [–∞, ∞) is upper semi-continuous, then f is bounded above and attains its supremum.

Proof

If $f(x) = - \infty$ for all x in [a,b], then the supremum is also $-\infty$ and the theorem is true. In all other cases, the proof is a slight modification of the proofs given above. In the proof of the boundedness theorem, the upper semi-continuity of f at x only implies that the limit superior of the subsequence {f(x_{n_{k}})} is bounded above by f(x) < ∞, but that is enough to obtain the contradiction. In the proof of the extreme value theorem, upper semi-continuity of f at d implies that the limit superior of the subsequence {f(d_{n_{k}})} is bounded above by f(d), but this suffices to conclude that f(d) = M. ∎

Applying this result to −f proves a similar result for the infimums of lower semicontinuous functions. A function $f : [a, b] \to [-\infty, \infty)$ is said to be lower semi-continuous if
$$\liminf_{y\to x} f(y) \geq f(x)\quad \forall x \in [a, b].$$

Theorem—If a function f : [a, b] → (–∞, ∞] is lower semi-continuous, then f is bounded below and attains its infimum.

A real-valued function is upper as well as lower semi-continuous, if and only if it is continuous in the usual sense. Hence these two theorems imply the boundedness theorem and the extreme value theorem.
