= Archimedean principle =

Archimedean principle may refer to:

- Archimedes' principle, a principle relating buoyancy with displacement
- Archimedean property, a mathematical property of numbers and other algebraic structures
