= Nested intervals =

Ranges of numbers contained in each other

4 members of a sequence of nested intervals

In mathematics, a sequence of nested intervals can be intuitively understood as an ordered collection of intervals $I_n$ on the real number line with natural numbers $n=1,2,3,\dots$ as an index. In order for a sequence of intervals to be considered nested intervals, two conditions have to be met:

1. Every interval in the sequence is contained in the previous one ($I_{n+1}$ is always a subset of $I_n$). In other words, the left bound of the interval $I_n$ can only increase ($a_{n+1}\geq a_n$), and the right bound can only decrease ($b_{n+1}\leq b_n$).
2. The length of the intervals get arbitrarily small (meaning the length falls below every possible threshold $\varepsilon$ after a certain index $N$).

Historically - long before anyone defined nested intervals in a textbook - people implicitly constructed such nestings for concrete calculation purposes. For example, the ancient Babylonians discovered a method for computing square roots of numbers. In contrast, the famed Archimedes constructed sequences of polygons, that inscribed and circumscribed a unit circle, in order to get a lower and upper bound for the circles circumference - which is the circle number Pi ($\pi$).

The central question to be posed is the nature of the intersection over all the natural numbers, or, put differently, the set of numbers, that are found in every Interval $I_n$ (thus, for all $n\in\mathbb{N}$). In modern mathematics, nested intervals are used as a construction method for the real numbers (in order to complete the field of rational numbers).

== Historic motivation ==
As stated in the introduction, historic users of mathematics discovered the nesting of intervals and closely related algorithms as methods for specific calculations. Some variations and modern interpretations of these ancient techniques will be introduced here:

=== Computation of square roots ===
When trying to find the square root of a number $x>1$, one can be certain that $1\leq \sqrt{x} \leq x$, which gives the first interval $I_1=[1, x]$, in which $x$ has to be found. If one knows the next higher perfect square $k^2 > x$, one can get an even better candidate for the first interval: $I_1=[1, k]$.

The other intervals $I_n=[a_n, b_n], n\in\mathbb{N}$ can now be defined recursively by looking at the sequence of midpoints $m_n=\frac{a_n + b_n}{2}$. Given the interval $I_n$ is already known (starting at $I_1$), one can define

$$I_{n+1} := \left\{\begin{matrix}
\left[m_n, b_n\right] && \text{if}\;\; m_n^2 \leq x \\
\left[a_n, m_n\right] && \text{if}\;\; m_n^2 > x
\end{matrix}\right.$$

To put this into words, one can compare the midpoint of $I_{n}$ to $\sqrt{x}$ in order to determine whether the midpoint is smaller or larger than $\sqrt{x}$. If the midpoint is smaller, one can set it as the lower bound of the next interval $I_{n+1}$, and if the midpoint is larger, one can set it as the upper bound of the next interval. This guarantees that $\sqrt{x}\in I_{n+1}$. With this construction the intervals are nested and their length $|I_n|$ get halved in every step of the recursion. Therefore, it is possible to get lower and upper bounds for $\sqrt{x}$ with arbitrarily good precision (given enough computational time).

One can also compute $\sqrt{y}$, when $0<y<1$. In this case $1/y>1$, and the algorithm can be used by setting $x:=1/y$ and calculating the reciprocal after the desired level of precision has been acquired.

==== Example ====
To demonstrate this algorithm, here is an example of how it can be used to find the value of $\sqrt{19}$. Note that since$1^2<19<5^2$, the first interval for the algorithm can be defined as$I_1:=[1,5]$, since $\sqrt{19}$ must certainly found within this interval. Thus, using this interval, one can continue to the next step of the algorithm by calculating the midpoint of the interval, determining whether the square of the midpoint is greater than or less than 19, and setting the boundaries of the next interval accordingly before repeating the process:

$$\begin{aligned}
m_1&=\dfrac{1+5}{2}=3   &&\Rightarrow\; m_1^2=9 \leq 19 &&\Rightarrow\; I_2=[3, 5]\\
m_2&=\dfrac{3+5}{2}=4  &&\Rightarrow\; m_2^2=16 \leq 19 &&\Rightarrow\; I_3=[4, 5]\\
m_3&=\dfrac{4+5}{2}=4.5 &&\Rightarrow\; m_3^2=20.25 > 19 &&\Rightarrow\; I_4=[4, 4.5]\\
m_4&=\dfrac{4+4.5}{2}=4.25 &&\Rightarrow\; m_4^2=18.0625 \leq 19 &&\Rightarrow\; I_5=[4.25, 4.5]\\
m_5&=\dfrac{4.25+4.5}{2}=4.375 &&\Rightarrow\; m_5^2=19.140625 > 19 &&\Rightarrow\; I_5=[4.25, 4.375]\\
&\vdots & &
\end{aligned}$$
Each time a new midpoint is calculated, the range of possible values for $\sqrt{19}$ is able to be constricted so that the values that remain within the interval are closer and closer to the actual value of $\sqrt{19}=4.35889894\dots$. That is to say, each successive change in the bounds of the interval within which $\sqrt{19}$ must lie allows the value of $\sqrt{19}$ to be estimated with a greater precision, either by increasing the lower bounds of the interval or decreasing the upper bounds of the interval.
This procedure can be repeated as many times as needed to attain the desired level of precision. Theoretically, by repeating the steps indefinitely, one can arrive at the true value of this square root.

==== Herons method ====
The Babylonian method uses an even more efficient algorithm that yields accurate approximations of $\sqrt{x}$ for an $x>0$ even faster. The modern description using nested intervals is similar to the algorithm above, but instead of using a sequence of midpoints, one uses a sequence $(c_n)_{n\in\mathbb{N}}$ given by

$$c_{n+1}:=\frac{1}{2}\cdot\left(c_n + \frac{x}{c_n}\right)$$.

This results in a sequence of intervals given by $I_{n+1}:=\left[\frac{x}{c_n}, c_n\right]$ and $I_1=[0, k]$, where $k^2>x$, will provide accurate upper and lower bounds for $\sqrt{x}$ very fast. In practice, only $c_n$ has to be considered, which converges to $\sqrt{x}$ (as does of course the lower interval bound). This algorithm is a special case of Newton's method.

=== Archimedes' circle measurement ===
π can be estimated by computing the perimeters of circumscribed and inscribed polygons.

As shown in the image, lower and upper bounds for the circumference of a circle can be obtained with inscribed and circumscribed regular polygons. When examining a circle with diameter $1$, the circumference is (by definition of Pi) the circle number $\pi$.

Around 250 BCE Archimedes of Syracuse started with regular hexagons, whose side lengths (and therefore circumference) can be directly calculated from the circle diameter. Furthermore, a way to compute the side length of a regular $2n$-gon from the previous $n$-gon can be found, starting at the regular hexagon ($6$-gon). By successively doubling the number of edges until reaching 96-sided polygons, Archimedes reached an interval with $\tfrac{223}{71}< \pi < \tfrac{22}{7}$. The upper bound $22/7 \approx 3.143$ is still often used as a rough, but pragmatic approximation of $\pi$.

Around the year 1600 CE, Archimedes' method was still the gold standard for calculating Pi and was used by Dutch mathematician Ludolph van Ceulen, to compute more than thirty digits of $\pi$, which took him decades. Soon after, more powerful methods for the computation were found.

=== Other implementations ===
Early uses of sequences of nested intervals (or can be described as such with modern mathematics), can be found in the predecessors of calculus (differentiation and integration). In computer science, sequences of nested intervals is used in algorithms for numerical computation. E.g. the bisection method can be used for calculating the roots of continuous functions. In contrast to mathematically infinite sequences, an applied computational algorithm terminates at some point, when the desired zero has been found or sufficiently well approximated.

== The construction of the real numbers ==
In mathematical analysis, nested intervals provide one method of axiomatically introducing the real numbers as the completion of the rational numbers, being a necessity for discussing the concepts of continuity and differentiability. Historically, Isaac Newton's and Gottfried Wilhelm Leibniz's discovery of differential and integral calculus from the late 1600s has posed a huge challenge for mathematicians trying to prove their methods rigorously; despite their success in physics, engineering and other sciences. The axiomatic description of nested intervals (or an equivalent axiom) has become an important foundation for the modern understanding of calculus.

In the context of this article, $\mathbb{R}$ in conjunction with $+$ and $\cdot$ is an Archimedean ordered field, meaning the axioms of order and the Archimedean property hold.

=== Definition ===
Let $(I_n)_{n\in\mathbb{N}}$ be a sequence of closed intervals of the type $I_n=[a_n, b_n]$, where $|I_n|:=b_n - a_n$ denotes the length of such an interval. One can call $(I_n)_{n\in\mathbb{N}}$ a sequence of nested intervals, if

1. $\quad \forall n \in \mathbb{N}: \;\; I_{n+1} \subseteq I_n$
2. $\quad \forall \varepsilon > 0 \; \exists N\in\mathbb{N}: \;\; |I_N| < \varepsilon$.

Put into words, property 1 means, that the intervals are nested according to their index. The second property formalizes the notion, that interval sizes get arbitrarily small; meaning, that for an arbitrary constant $\varepsilon > 0$ one can always find an interval (with index $N$) with a length strictly smaller than that number $\varepsilon$. It is also worth noting that property 1 immediately implies that every interval with an index $n \geq N$ must also have a length $|I_n| < \varepsilon$.

==== Remark ====
Note that some authors refer to such interval-sequences, satisfying both properties above, as shrinking nested intervals. In this case a sequence of nested intervals refers to a sequence that only satisfies property 1.

=== Axiom of completeness ===
If $(I_n)_{n\in\mathbb{N}}$ is a sequence of nested intervals, there always exists a real number that is contained in every interval $I_n$. In formal notation this axiom guarantees, that

$$\exists x\in\mathbb{R}: \;x\in\bigcap_{n\in\mathbb{N}} I_n$$.

==== Theorem ====
The intersection of each sequence $(I_n)_{n\in\mathbb{N}}$ of nested intervals contains exactly one real number $x$.

Proof: This statement can easily be verified by contradiction. Assume that there exist two different numbers $x,y\in\cap_{n\in\mathbb{N}} I_n$. From $x\neq y$ it follows that they differ by $|x-y|>0.$ Since both numbers have to be contained in every interval, it follows that $|I_n|\geq |x-y|$ for all $n\in\mathbb{N}$. This contradicts property 2 from the definition of nested intervals; therefore, the intersection can contain at most one number $x$. The completeness axiom guarantees that such a real number $x$ exists. $\; \square$

==== Notes ====
- This axiom is fundamental in the sense that a sequence of nested intervals does not necessarily contain a rational number - meaning that $\cap_{n\in\mathbb{N}}I_n$ could yield $\emptyset$, if only considering the rationals.
- The axiom is equivalent to the existence of the infimum and supremum (proof below), the convergence of Cauchy sequences and the Bolzano–Weierstrass theorem. This means that one of the four has to be introduced axiomatically, while the other three can be successively proven.

== Direct consequences of the axiom ==
=== Existence of roots ===
By generalizing the algorithm shown above for square roots, one can prove that in the real numbers, the equation $x=y^j,\; j\in\mathbb{N}, x>0$ can always be solved for $y=\sqrt[j]{x}=x^{1/j}$. This means there exists a unique real number $y>0$, such that $x=y^k$. Comparing to the section above, one achieves a sequence of nested intervals for the $k$-th root of $x$, namely $y$, by looking at whether the midpoint $m_n$ of the $n$-th interval is lower or equal or greater than $m_n^k$.

=== Existence of infimum and supremum in bounded sets ===
==== Definition ====
If $A\subset \mathbb{R}$ has an upper bound, i.e. there exists a number $b$, such that $x\leq b$ for all $x\in A$, one can call the number $s=\sup(A)$ the supremum of $A$, if

1. the number $s$ is an upper bound of $A$, meaning $\forall x \in A: \; x\leq s$
2. $s$ is the least upper bound of $A$, meaning $\forall \sigma < s : \; \exists x\in A: \; x >\sigma$

Only one such number $s$ can exist. Analogously one can define the infimum ($\inf(B)$) of a set $B\subset \mathbb{R}$, that is bounded from below, as the greatest lower bound of that set.

==== Theorem ====
Each set $A\subset \mathbb{R}$ has a supremum (infimum), if it is bounded from above (below).

Proof: Without loss of generality one can look at a set $A\subset \mathbb{R}$ that has an upper bound. One can now construct a sequence $(I_n)_{n\in\mathbb{N}}$ of nested intervals $I_n=[a_n, b_n]$, that has the following two properties:

1. $b_n$ is an upper bound of $A$ for all $n\in\mathbb{N}$
2. $a_n$ is never an upper bound of $A$ for any $n\in\mathbb{N}$.

The construction follows a recursion by starting with any number $a_1$, that is not an upper bound (e.g. $a_1=c - 1$, where $c\in A$ and an arbitrary upper bound $b_1$ of $A$). Given $I_n=[a_n, b_n]$ for some $n\in\mathbb{N}$ one can compute the midpoint $m_n:= \frac{a_n+b_n}{2}$ and define

$$I_{n+1} := \left\{\begin{matrix}
\left[a_n, m_n\right] && \text{if}\; m_n \;\text{is an upper bound of}\; A \\
\left[m_n, b_n\right] && \text{if}\; m_n \;\text{is not an upper bound}
\end{matrix}\right.$$

Note that this interval sequence is well defined and obviously a sequence of nested intervals by construction.

Now let $s$ be the number in every interval (whose existence is guaranteed by the axiom). $s$ is an upper bound of $A$, otherwise there exists a number $x\in A$, such that $x>s$. Furthermore, this would imply the existence of an interval $I_m=[a_m, b_m]$ with $b_m - a_m < x-s$, from which $b_m - s < x-s$ follows, due to $s$ also being an element of $I_m$. But this is a contradiction to property 1 of the supremum (meaning $b_m<s$ for all $m\in\mathbb{N}$). Therefore $s$ is in fact an upper bound of $A$.

Assume that there exists a lower upper bound $\sigma < s$ of $A$. Since $(I_n)_{n\in\mathbb{N}}$ is a sequence of nested intervals, the interval lengths get arbitrarily small; in particular, there exists an interval with a length smaller than $s-\sigma$. But from $s\in I_n$ one gets $s-a_n<s-\sigma$ and therefore $a_n>\sigma$. Following the rules of this construction, $a_n$ would have to be an upper bound of $A$, contradicting property 2 of all sequences of nested intervals.

In two steps, it has been shown that $s$ is an upper bound of $A$ and that a lower upper bound cannot exist. Therefore $s$ is the supremum of $A$ by definition.

==== Remark ====
As was seen, the existence of suprema and infima of bounded sets is a consequence of the completeness of $\mathbb{R}$. In effect the two are actually equivalent, meaning that either of the two can be introduced axiomatically.

Proof: Let $(I_n)_{n\in\mathbb{N}}$ with $I_n=[a_n, b_n]$ be a sequence of nested intervals. Then the set $A:=\{a_1, a_2,\dots\}$ is bounded from above, where every $b_n$ is an upper bound. This implies, that the least upper bound $s=\sup(A)$ fulfills $a_n\leq s\leq b_n$ for all $n\in\mathbb{N}$. Therefore $s\in I_n$ for all $n\in\mathbb{N}$, respectively $s\in\cap_{n\in\mathbb{N}} I_n$.

=== Further consequences ===
After formally defining the convergence of sequences and accumulation points of sequences, one can also prove the Bolzano–Weierstrass theorem using nested intervals. In a follow-up, the fact, that Cauchy sequences are convergent (and that all convergent sequences are Cauchy sequences) can be proven. This in turn allows for a proof of the completeness property above, showing their equivalence.

== Further discussion of related aspects ==
Without any specifying what is meant by interval, all that can be said about the intersection $\cap_{n\in\mathbb{N}} I_n$ over all the naturals (i.e. the set of all points common to each interval) is that it is either the empty set $\emptyset$, a point on the number line (called a singleton $\{x\}$), or some interval.

The possibility of an empty intersection can be illustrated by looking at a sequence of open intervals $I_n=\left(0, \frac{1}{n}\right) = \left\{x\in\mathbb{R}:0<x<\frac{1}{n}\right\}$.

In this case, the empty set $\emptyset$ results from the intersection $\cap_{n\in\mathbb{N}} I_n$. This result comes from the fact that, for any number $x>0$ there exists some value of $n\in\mathbb{N}$ (namely any $n>1/x$), such that $1/n<x$. This is given by the Archimedean property of the real numbers. Therefore, no matter how small $x > 0$, one can always find intervals $I_n$ in the sequence, such that $x\notin I_n,$ implying that the intersection has to be empty.

The situation is different for closed intervals. If one changes the situation above by looking at closed intervals of the type $I_n=\left[0, \frac{1}{n}\right] = \left\{x\in\mathbb{R}:0 \leq x \leq \frac{1}{n}\right\}$, one can see this very clearly. Now for each $x>0$ one still can always find intervals not containing said $x$, but for $x=0$, the property $0\leq x \leq 1/n$ holds true for any $n\in\mathbb{N}$. One can conclude that, in this case, $\cap_{n\in\mathbb{N}} I_n = \{0\}$.

One can also consider the complement of each interval, written as $(-\infty,a_n) \cup (b_n, \infty)$ - which, in our last example, is $(-\infty,0) \cup (1/n, \infty)$. By De Morgan's laws, the complement of the intersection is a union of two disjoint open sets. By the connectedness of the real line there must be something between them. This shows that the intersection of (even an uncountable number of) nested, closed, and bounded intervals is nonempty.

== Higher dimensions ==
In two dimensions there is a similar result: nested closed disks in the plane must have a common intersection. This result was shown by Hermann Weyl to classify the singular behaviour of certain differential equations.

== See also ==
- Bisection
- Cantor's intersection theorem
