= Rocky Mountain Journal of Mathematics =

The Rocky Mountain Journal of Mathematics
- Discipline: Mathematics
- Language: English

Publication details
- History: 1971–present
- Publisher: Rocky Mountain Mathematics Consortium
- Frequency: Bimonthly

Standard abbreviations
- ISO 4: Rocky Mt. J. Math.
- MathSciNet: Rocky Mountain J. Math.

Indexing
- CODEN: RMJMAE
- ISSN: 0035-7596
- LCCN: 77612778
- OCLC no.: 01764461

Links
- Journal homepage; Online access; impact factor

The Rocky Mountain Journal of Mathematics is a peer-reviewed mathematics journal published by the Rocky Mountain Mathematics Consortium. Founded in 1971, the journal publishes research articles on mathematics. The journal is indexed by Mathematical Reviews and Zentralblatt MATH.
