= Heine–Borel theorem =

Subset of Euclidean space is compact if and only if it is closed and bounded

In real analysis in mathematics, the Heine–Borel theorem, named after Eduard Heine and Émile Borel, states:

For a subset $S$ of Euclidean space $\mathbb{R}^n$, the following two statements are equivalent:

- $S$ is compact, that is, every open cover of $S$ has a finite subcover
- $S$ is closed and bounded.

The theorem is sometimes also called the Borel–Lebesgue lemma.

== History ==
The history of what today is called the Heine–Borel theorem starts in the 19th century, with the search for solid foundations of real analysis. Central to the theory was the concept of uniform continuity and the theorem stating that every continuous function on a closed and bounded interval is uniformly continuous. Peter Gustav Lejeune Dirichlet was the first to prove this and implicitly he used the existence of a finite subcover of a given open cover of a closed interval in his proof. He used this proof in his 1852 lectures, which were published only in 1904. Later Eduard Heine, Karl Weierstrass and Salvatore Pincherle used similar techniques. Émile Borel in 1895 was the first to state and prove a form of what is now called the Heine–Borel theorem. His formulation was restricted to countable covers. Pierre Cousin (1895), Lebesgue (1898) and Schoenflies (1900) generalized it to arbitrary covers.

== Proofs ==
=== Proof 1 ===
If a set is compact, then it must be closed.

Let $S$ be a subset of $\mathbb{R}^n$. Observe first the following: if $a$ is a limit point of $S$, then any finite collection $C$ of open sets, such that each open set $U\in C$ is disjoint from some neighborhood $V_U$ of $a$, fails to be a cover of $S$. Indeed, the intersection of the finite family of sets $V_U$ is a neighborhood $W$ of $a$ in $\mathbb{R}^n$. Since $a$ is a limit point of $S$, $W$ must contain a point $x$ in $S$. This $x\in S$ is not covered by the family $C$, because every $U$ in $C$ is disjoint from $V_U$ and hence disjoint from $W$, which contains $x$.

If $S$ is compact but not closed, then it has a limit point $a\not\in S$. Consider a collection $C'$ consisting of an open neighborhood $N(x)$ for each $x\in S$, chosen small enough to not intersect some neighborhood $V_x$ of $a$. Then $C'$ is an open cover of $S$, but any finite subcollection of $C'$ has the form of $C$ discussed previously, and thus cannot be an open subcover of $S$. This contradicts the compactness of $S$. Hence, every limit point of $S$ is in $S$, so $S$ is closed.

The proof above applies with almost no change to showing that any compact subset $S$ of a Hausdorff topological space $X$ is closed in $X$.

If a set is compact, then it is bounded.

Let $S$ be a compact set in $\mathbb{R}^n$, and $U_x$ a ball of radius 1 centered at $x\in\mathbb{R}^n$. Then the set of all such balls centered at $x\in S$ is clearly an open cover of $S$, since $\cup_{x\in S} U_x$ contains all of $S$. Since $S$ is compact, take a finite subcover of this cover. This subcover is the finite union of balls of radius 1. Consider all pairs of centers of these (finitely many) balls (of radius 1) and let $M$ be the maximum of the distances between them. Then if $C_p$ and $C_q$ are the centers (respectively) of unit balls containing arbitrary $p,q\in S$, the triangle inequality says:

$$d(p, q)\le d(p, C_p) + d(C_p, C_q) + d(C_q, q)\le 1 + M + 1 = M + 2.$$

So the diameter of $S$ is bounded by $M+2$.

Lemma: A closed subset of a compact set is compact.

Let $K$ be a closed subset of a compact set $T$ in $\mathbb{R}^n$ and let $C_K$ be an open cover of $K$. Then $U=\mathbb{R}^n\setminus K$ is an open set and

$$C_T = C_K \cup \{U\}$$

is an open cover of $T$. Since $T$ is compact, then $C_T$ has a finite subcover $C_T'$, that also covers the smaller set $K$. Since $U$ does not contain any point of $K$, the set $K$ is already covered by $C_K' = C_T' \setminus \{U\}$, that is a finite subcollection of the original collection $C_K$. It is thus possible to extract from any open cover $C_K$ of $K$ a finite subcover.

If a set is closed and bounded, then it is compact.

If a set $S$ in $\mathbb{R}^n$ is bounded, then it can be enclosed within an $n$-box

$$T_0 = [-a, a]^n$$

where $a>0$. By the lemma above, it is enough to show that $T_0$ is compact.

Assume, by way of contradiction, that $T_0$ is not compact. Then there exists an infinite open cover $C$ of $T_0$ that does not admit any finite subcover. Through bisection of each of the sides of $T_0$, the box $T_0$ can be broken up into $2^n$ sub $n$-boxes, each of which has diameter equal to half the diameter of $T_0$. Then at least one of the $2^n$ sections of $T_0$ must require an infinite subcover of $C$, otherwise $C$ itself would have a finite subcover, by uniting together the finite covers of the sections. Call this section $T_1$.

Likewise, the sides of $T_1$ can be bisected, yielding $2^n$ sections of $T_1$, at least one of which must require an infinite subcover of $C$. Continuing in like manner yields a decreasing sequence of nested $n$-boxes:

$$T_0 \supset T_1 \supset T_2 \supset \ldots \supset T_k \supset \ldots$$

where the side length of $T_k$ is $(2a)/2^k$, which tends to 0 as $k$ tends to infinity. Let us define a sequence $(x_k)$ such that each $x_k$ is in $T_k$. This sequence is Cauchy, so it must converge to some limit $L$. Since each $T_k$ is closed, and for each $k$ the sequence $(x_k)$ is eventually always inside $T_k$, we see that $L\in T_k$ for each $k$.

Since $C$ covers $T_0$, then it has some member $U\in C$ such that $L\in U$. Since $U$ is open, there is an $n$-ball $B(L)\subseteq U$. For large enough $k$, one has $T_k\subseteq B(L)\subseteq U$, but then the infinite number of members of $C$ needed to cover $T_k$ can be replaced by just one: $U$, a contradiction.

Thus, $T_0$ is compact. Since $S$ is closed and a subset of the compact set $T_0$, then $S$ is also compact (see the lemma above).

=== Proof without Choice ===
The theorem can be proved without the use of the axiom of choice. First we prove

Proposition—The unit interval $I = [0, 1]$ is compact.

Proof: Let $\mathcal{U}$ be an open cover of $I$. Consider the set
$$E = \{ x \in [0, 1] \mid [0, x] \text{ is covered by a finite subcover of } \, \mathcal{U} \}.$$
It is nonempty and bounded. Thus, $b := \sup(E)$ exists as a finite number. We claim $b = 1$. Suppose otherwise; then $b < 1$. Since $\mathcal{U}$ is a cover, $b$ is in some $U \in \mathcal{U}$. By the definition of sup, there is some $x$ in $E$ with $[x, b] \subset U$. Then for $b' > b$ close to $b$,
$$[0, b'] = [0, x] \cup [x, b']$$
is covered by a finite subcover of $\mathcal{U}$; i.e., $b' \in E$, contradicting that $b$ is an upper bound of $E$. Hence, $b = 1$. Then, by a similar argument, $b = 1$ is in $E$. $\square$

The theorem now follows easily. Indeed, by Tychonoff's theorem for finite products, the standard cube $I^n$ is compact (the full version of the theorem is equivalent to the axiom of choice, but the theorem for finite products is much easier and does not use Choice.) Since cubes are homeomorphic to each other, arbitrary cubes are compact and each closed bounded set is contained in some cube; thus, compact. Finally, it is not hard to see the converse (a compact set in $\mathbb{R}^n$ is closed and bounded) without the axiom of choice. $\square$

We also have, still not assuming the axiom choice:

Theorem—Each closed bounded subset of $\mathbb{R}^n$ is sequentially compact.

Indeed, "compact" implies "sequentially compact", without Choice, as follows. Given a sequence $x_i$ in a compact set in $\mathbb{R}^n$, take $E_i = \overline{\{ x_j \mid j \ge i \}}$. The family $E_i, i \ge 1$ has the finite intersection property and so has nonempty intersection by compactness. Let $x \in \cap_i E_i$. Then let $U_m$ be the open ball with center at $x$ and of radius $1/m$. Since $U_1$ intersects $\{ x_j \mid j \ge 1 \}$, let $i_1$ be the least integer such that $x_{i_1}$ is in $U_1$, possible since $\mathbb{N}$ is well-ordered. Then let $i_2$ be the least integer such that $i_2 > i_1$ and $x_{i_2}$ is in $U_2$, and so on. The sequence $x_{i_k}$ is a convergent subsequence then. $\square$

Note the above version implies the Bolzano–Weierstrass theorem, that a bounded sequence in $\mathbb{R}^n$ has a convergent sequence.

With the axiom of choice, the converse of the above theorem holds. Indeed, clearly, "sequentially compact" implies "closed". Also, if the set is unbounded, then clearly we can construct a sequence $x_i$ in the set such that $|x_i - x_j| \ge 1$ for $j < i$; in particular, the sequence has no convergent sequence. This step uses the axiom of choice (or more precisely countable choice).

Without the axiom of choice, the converse of the above theorem can fail; in fact, there is a model of ZF in which $\mathbb{R}$ has a sequentially compact subset that is neither closed nor bounded.

== Generalization ==
The Heine–Borel theorem is somewhat subsumed in the following more general result.

Theorem—Let $X$ be a metric space. Then the following are equivalent.

1. $X$ is compact.
2. $X$ is sequentially compact.
3. Every infinite subset of $X$ has a limit point in $X$.
4. $X$ is complete and totally bounded, where "totally bounded" means, for each $\epsilon$ > 0, the space is covered by a finite number of open balls of radius $\epsilon$.

The usual Heine–Borel theorem follows from the above since a set in $\mathbb{R}^n$ is bounded if and only if it is totally bounded.

In general, given a sequence $x_n$, each point in the intersection
$$\cap_n \overline{ \{ x_m \mid m \ge n \} }$$
is called a cluster point. In other words, a point is a cluster point of $x_n$ if each neighborhood of that point contains infinitely many (possibly repeated) terms in the sequence. For a metric space, a sequence has a convergent subsequence if and only if it has a cluster point. Thus, the statement (2) above is equivalent to saying each sequence has a cluster point.

Proof: (1) $\Rightarrow$ (2) clear (cf. § Proof without Choice). (2) $\Rightarrow$ (3): if $S \subset X$ is an infinite subset, by the axiom of choice, it contains a countable subset whose limit points are among the limit points of $S$. Thus, we can assume $S = \{ x_n \mid n \in \mathbb{N} \}$ is countable. Then, by (2), $x_n$ has a cluster point, which is a limit point of $S$.

(3) $\Rightarrow$ (4): First, $X$ is complete since a Cauchy sequence has a limit by (3). Next, assume $X$ is not totally bounded; i.e., there is some $\epsilon > 0$ with the property that no finite number of open balls of radius $\epsilon$ covers $X$. Then, recursively, choose a sequence $x_n$ such that
$$x_n \not\in B(x_1, \epsilon) \cup \cdots \cup B(x_{n-1}, \epsilon).$$
Then the set $S = \{ x_n \mid n \}$ is infinite and has no limit point.

(4) $\Rightarrow$ (1) is by adapting an argument of Bourbaki. We shall show a family $F$ of closed subsets of $X$ with the finite intersection property (i.e., each finite subset of $F$ has nonempty intersection) has nonempty intersection. Consider the set of all families of subsets of $X$ with the finite intersection property, ordered by set inclusion. Clearly, the hypothesis of Zorn's lemma is satisfied and so it has a maximal element $M$ that contains $F$. We note $M$ has the property

- If $X = S_1 \cup \cdots \cup S_n$ for some sets $S_j$'s, then $S_j \in M$ for some $j$.

Indeed, suppose no $S_j$ is in $M$. Since each $M \cup \{ S_j \}$ does not have the finite intersection property, we have $T_j \cap S_j = \emptyset$ for some intersections $T_j$ of finite subsets of $M$. Then

$$\emptyset \ne \cap_j T_j \subset \cap_j (X - S_j)$$,

meaning $S_j$'s do not cover $X$.

Now, since $X$ is totally bounded, for each integer $n > 0$, $M$ contains an open ball $B_n$ of radius $1/n$ by the above property. For each $n$, let $x_n$ be in $B_1 \cap \cdots \cap B_n$, which is possible by the finite intersection property. For $m \ge n$, $x_m, x_n$ are both in $B_n$. Hence, the sequence $x_n$ is Cauchy and, by completeness, it converges to a limit $x$. For each $\epsilon > 0$, we have:
$$B_n \subset B(x, \epsilon)$$
if $n$ is large enough. Indeed, for $y$ in $B_n$,
$$d(y, x) \le d(y, x_n) + d(x_n, x) < 2/n + d(x_n, x) <  \epsilon$$
if $n$ is large. Hence, for such $n$, $\emptyset \neq B_n \cap S \subset B(x, \epsilon) \cap S$ for $S$ in $M$. That is, $x$ is in $\overline{S}$ for each $S$ in $M$. A fortiori, $x \in \cap F$ then. $\square$

The proof of (4) $\Rightarrow$ (1) above in fact shows the following more general result for uniform spaces; indeed, Bourbaki's original argument was for uniform spaces.

Theorem—Let $X$ be a Hausdorff uniform space. Then $X$ is compact if and only if $X$ is complete and for each entourage $V$, there exists a finite cover of $X$ consisting of subsets $B$ of $X$ such that $B \times B \subset V.$

== Heine–Borel property ==
The Heine–Borel theorem does not hold as stated for general metric and topological vector spaces, and this gives rise to the necessity to consider special classes of spaces where this proposition is true. These spaces are said to have the Heine–Borel property.

=== In the theory of metric spaces ===
A metric space $(X,d)$ is said to have the Heine–Borel property if each closed, bounded set in $X$ is compact.

Many metric spaces fail to have the Heine–Borel property, such as the metric space of rational numbers (or indeed any incomplete metric space). Complete metric spaces may also fail to have the property; for instance, no infinite-dimensional Banach spaces have the Heine–Borel property (as metric spaces). Even more trivially, if the real line is not endowed with the usual metric, it may fail to have the Heine–Borel property.

A metric space $(X,d)$ has a Heine–Borel metric which is Cauchy locally identical to $d$ if and only if it is complete, $\sigma$-compact, and locally compact.

=== In the theory of topological vector spaces ===
A topological vector space $X$ is said to have the Heine–Borel property (R.E. Edwards uses the term boundedly compact space) if each closed bounded set in $X$ is compact. No infinite-dimensional Banach spaces have the Heine–Borel property (as topological vector spaces). But some infinite-dimensional Fréchet spaces do have, for instance, the space $C^\infty(\Omega)$ of smooth functions on an open set $\Omega\subset\mathbb{R}^n$ and the space $H(\Omega)$ of holomorphic functions on an open set $\Omega\subset\mathbb{C}^n$. More generally, any quasi-complete nuclear space has the Heine–Borel property. All Montel spaces have the Heine–Borel property as well.

== See also ==
- Bolzano–Weierstrass theorem
