= List of exponential topics =

This is a list of exponential topics, by Wikipedia page. See also list of logarithm topics.

- Accelerating change
- Approximating natural exponents (log base e)
- Artin–Hasse exponential
- Bacterial growth
- Baker–Campbell–Hausdorff formula
- Barometric formula
- Beer–Lambert law
- Carlitz exponential
- Catenary
- Cell growth
- Characterizations of the exponential function
- Compound interest
- C_{0}-semigroup
- De Moivre's formula
- Derivative of the exponential map
- Doléans-Dade exponential
- Double exponential function
- Doubling time
- e-folding
- Elimination half-life
- Error exponent
- Euler's formula
- Euler's identity
- e (mathematical constant)
- Exponent
- Exponent bias
- Exponential (disambiguation)
- Exponential backoff
- Exponential decay
- Exponential dichotomy
- Exponential discounting
- Exponential diophantine equation
- Exponential dispersion model
- Exponential distribution
- Exponential error
- Exponential factorial
- Exponential family
- Exponential field
  - Ordered exponential field
- Exponential formula
- Exponential function
- Exponential generating function
- Exponential-Golomb coding
- Exponential growth
- Exponential hierarchy
- Exponential integral
- Exponential integrator
- Exponential map (Lie theory)
- Exponential map (Riemannian geometry)
- Exponential map (discrete dynamical systems)
- Exponential notation
- Exponential object (category theory)
- Exponential polynomials—see also Touchard polynomials (combinatorics)
- Exponential response formula
- Exponential sheaf sequence
- Exponential smoothing
- Exponential stability
- Exponential sum
- Exponential time
  - Sub-exponential time
- Exponential tree
- Exponential type
- Exponentially equivalent measures
- Exponentiating by squaring
- Exponentiation
- Forgetting curve
- Four exponentials conjecture
- Fourier analysis
  - List of Fourier analysis topics
- Gaussian function
- Gudermannian function
- Half-exponential function
- Half-life
- Hyperbolic function
- Inflation, inflation rate
- Interest
- Lambert W function
- Lifetime (physics)
- Limiting factor
- Lindemann–Weierstrass theorem
- List of integrals of exponential functions
- List of integrals of hyperbolic functions
- Lyapunov exponent
- Malthusian catastrophe
- Malthusian growth model
- Marshall–Olkin exponential distribution
- Matrix exponential
- Modular exponentiation
- Moore's law
- Nachbin's theorem
- Ordered exponential
- Piano key frequencies
- Plethystic exponential
- p-adic exponential function
- Power law
- Proof that e is irrational
- Proof that e is transcendental
- q-exponential
- Radioactive decay
- Rule of 70, Rule of 72
- Schanuel's conjecture
- Scientific notation
- Six exponentials theorem
- Spontaneous emission
- Super-exponentiation
- Tetration
- Transseries
- Versor
- Weber–Fechner law
- Wilkie's theorem
- Zenzizenzizenzic
