= Levi-Civita field =

System of numbers with non-finite quantities

In mathematics, the Levi-Civita field, named after Tullio Levi-Civita, is a non-Archimedean ordered field; i.e., a system of numbers containing infinite and infinitesimal quantities. It is usually denoted $\mathcal{R}$.

Each member $a$ can be constructed as a formal series of the form

$$a = \sum_{q\in\mathbb{Q}} a_q\varepsilon^q ,$$

where $\mathbb{Q}$ is the set of rational numbers, the coefficients $a_q$ are real numbers, and $\varepsilon$ is to be interpreted as a fixed positive infinitesimal. We require that for every rational number $r$, there are only finitely many $q\in\mathbb{Q}$ less than $r$ with $a_q\neq 0$; this restriction is necessary in order to make multiplication and division well defined and unique. Two such series are considered equal only if all their coefficients are equal. The ordering is defined according to the dictionary ordering of the list of coefficients, which is equivalent to the assumption that $\varepsilon$ is an infinitesimal.

The real numbers are embedded in this field as series in which all of the coefficients vanish except $a_0$.

== Example elements ==
- $7\varepsilon$ is an infinitesimal that is greater than $\varepsilon$, but less than every positive real number.
- $\varepsilon^2$ is less than $\varepsilon$, and is also less than $r\varepsilon$ for any positive real $r$.
- $1+\varepsilon$ differs infinitesimally from 1.
- $\varepsilon^{1/2}$ is greater than $\varepsilon$ and even greater than $r\varepsilon$ for any positive real $r$, but $\varepsilon^{1/2}$ is still less than every positive real number.
- $1/\varepsilon$ is greater than any real number.
- $1+\varepsilon+\varepsilon^2/2+\cdots+\varepsilon^n/n!+\cdots$ is interpreted as $e^\varepsilon$, which differs infinitesimally from 1.
- $1+\varepsilon + 2\varepsilon^2 + \cdots + n!\varepsilon^n + \cdots$ is a valid member of the field, because the series is to be constructed formally, without any consideration of convergence. It differs infinitesimally from 1 and is smaller than $1+2\varepsilon$.

== Definition of the field operations and positive cone ==
If $a=\textstyle\sum \limits_{q \in \mathbb{Q}}a_q \varepsilon^q$ and $b=\textstyle\sum \limits_{q \in \mathbb{Q}}b_q \varepsilon^q$ are two Levi-Civita series, then

- their sum $a+b$ is the pointwise sum $a+b:=\textstyle\sum \limits_{q \in \mathbb{Q}}(a_q+b_q) \varepsilon^q$.
- their product $ab$ is the Cauchy product $ab:=\textstyle\sum\limits_{q \in \mathbb{Q}}\big(\!\sum \limits_{r+s=q} a_r b_s \big)\varepsilon^q$.

One can check that for every $q\in\mathbb{Q}$ the set

$$\{(r,s) \in \mathbb{Q}\times\mathbb{Q}: \ r+s=q,\ a_r \neq 0,\ b_s \neq 0\}$$

is finite, so that all the products are well-defined, and that the resulting series defines a valid Levi-Civita series. Moreover,

- their quotient is defined by polynomial long division. Division of two finite series may result in an infinite series, analogous to infinite decimal expansions.
- the relation $0<a$ holds if $a\neq 0$ (i.e. at least one coefficient of $a$ is non-zero) and the least non-zero coefficient of $a$ is strictly positive.

Equipped with those operations and order, the Levi-Civita field is indeed an ordered field extension of $\mathbb{R}$ where the series $\varepsilon$ is a positive infinitesimal.

== Properties and applications ==
The Levi-Civita field is real-closed, meaning that it can be algebraically closed by adjoining an imaginary unit, or by letting the coefficients be complex. It is rich enough to allow a significant amount of analysis to be done, but its elements can still be represented on a computer in the same sense that real numbers can be represented using floating point. It is the basis of automatic differentiation, a way to perform differentiation in cases that are intractable by symbolic differentiation or finite-difference methods.

The Levi-Civita field is also Cauchy complete, meaning that relativizing the $\forall \exists\forall$ definitions of Cauchy sequence and convergent sequence to sequences of Levi-Civita series, each Cauchy sequence in the field converges. Equivalently, it has no proper dense ordered field extension.

As an ordered field, it has a natural valuation given by the rational exponent corresponding to the first non zero coefficient of a Levi-Civita series. The valuation ring is that of series bounded by real numbers, the residue field is $\mathbb{R}$, and the value group is $(\mathbb{Q},+)$. The resulting valued field is Henselian (being real closed with a convex valuation ring) but not spherically complete. Indeed, the field of Hahn series with real coefficients and value group $(\mathbb{Q},+)$ is a proper immediate extension, containing series such as $1+\varepsilon^{1/2}+\varepsilon^{2/3}+\varepsilon^{3/4}+\varepsilon^{4/5}+\cdots$ which are not in the Levi-Civita field.

== Relations to other ordered fields ==
The Levi-Civita field is the Cauchy-completion of the field $\mathbb{P}$ of Puiseux series over the field of real numbers, that is, it is a dense extension of $\mathbb{P}$ without proper dense extension. Here is a list of some of its notable proper subfields and its proper ordered field extensions:

=== Notable subfields ===
- The field $\mathbb{R}$ of real numbers.
- The field $\mathbb{R}(\varepsilon)$ of fractions of real polynomials (rational functions) with infinitesimal positive indeterminate $\varepsilon$.
- The field $\mathbb{R}((\varepsilon))$ of formal Laurent series over $\mathbb{R}$.
- The field $\mathbb{P}$ of Puiseux series over $\mathbb{R}$.

=== Notable extensions ===
- The field $\mathbb{R}[[\varepsilon^{\mathbb{Q}}]]$ of Hahn series with real coefficients and rational exponents.
- The field $\mathbb{T}^{LE}$ of logarithmic-exponential transseries.
- The field $\mathbf{No}(\varepsilon_0)$ of surreal numbers with birthdate below the ordinal number $\varepsilon_0$.
- Fields of hyperreal numbers constructed as ultrapowers of $\mathbb{R}$ modulo a free ultrafilter on $\mathbb{N}$ (although here the embeddings are not canonical).
