= Exponent (disambiguation) =

Exponentiation is a mathematical operation.

Exponent may also refer to:

== Mathematics ==
- List of exponential topics
- Exponential function, a function of a certain form
- Matrix exponential, a matrix function on square matrices
- The least common multiple of a periodic group

=== Statistics ===
- Exponential distribution, a probability distribution
- Exponential family, a parametric set of probability distributions of a certain form
- Exponential growth, a specific way that a quantity may increase over time
- Exponential decay, decreasing quantity at a rate proportional to current value

== Linguistics ==
- Exponent (linguistics), the expression of one or more grammatical properties by sound.

== Music ==
- The Exponents, a New Zealand rock group

== Publications ==
- Purdue Exponent, a student newspaper of Purdue University
- Woman's Exponent, a publication of The Church of Jesus Christ of Latter-day Saints
- Exponent II, a quarterly periodical for Latter-day Saint women
- The Exponent (Montana State University), a student newspaper of Montana State University – Bozeman
- The Brooklyn Exponent, a weekly newspaper serving communities in Michigan
- The Jewish Exponent, a weekly community newspaper in Philadelphia, Pennsylvania

== Companies ==
- Exponent (consulting firm), an American engineering and scientific consulting firm

== Other uses ==
- Currency exponent, used in ISO 4271
- Exponent (podcast), podcast co-hosted by Ben Thompson

== See also ==
- Exponential (disambiguation)
