= Ordered exponential field =

Ordered field with a function generalizing the exponential function

In mathematics, an ordered exponential field is an ordered field together with a function which generalises the idea of exponential functions on the ordered field of real numbers.

== Definition ==
An exponential $E$ on an ordered field $K$ is a strictly increasing isomorphism of the additive group of $K$ onto the multiplicative group of positive elements of $K$. The ordered field $K\,$ together with the additional function $E\,$ is called an ordered exponential field.

== Examples ==
- The canonical example for an ordered exponential field is the ordered field of real numbers R with any function of the form $a^x$ where $a$ is a real number greater than 1. One such function is the usual exponential function, that is E(x) = e^{x}. The ordered field R equipped with this function gives the ordered real exponential field, denoted by R_{exp}. It was proved in the 1990s that R_{exp} is model complete, a result known as Wilkie's theorem. This result, when combined with Khovanskiĭ's theorem on pfaffian functions, proves that R_{exp} is also o-minimal. Alfred Tarski posed the question of the decidability of R_{exp} and hence it is now known as Tarski's exponential function problem. It is known that if the real version of Schanuel's conjecture is true then R_{exp} is decidable.
- The ordered field of surreal numbers $\mathbf{No}$ admits an exponential which extends the exponential function exp on R. Since $\mathbf{No}$ does not have the Archimedean property, this is an example of a non-Archimedean ordered exponential field.
- The ordered field of logarithmic-exponential transseries $\mathbb{T}^{LE}$ is constructed specifically in a way such that it admits a canonical exponential.

== Formally exponential fields ==
A formally exponential field, also called an exponentially closed field, is an ordered field that can be equipped with an exponential $E$. For any formally exponential field $K$, one can choose an exponential $E$ on $K$ such that $1+1/n<E(1)<n$ for some natural number $n$.

== Properties ==
- Every ordered exponential field $K$ is root-closed, i.e., every positive element of $K\,$ has an $n$-th root for all positive integers $n$ (or in other words the multiplicative group of positive elements of $K\,$ is divisible). This is so because $E\left(\frac{1}{n}E^{-1}(a)\right)^n=E(E^{-1}(a))=a$ for all $a>0$.
- Consequently, every ordered exponential field is a Euclidean field.
- Consequently, every ordered exponential field is an ordered Pythagorean field.
- Not every real-closed field is a formally exponential field, e.g., the field of real algebraic numbers does not admit an exponential. This is so because an exponential $E$ has to be of the form $E(x)=a^x\,$ for some $1<a\in K$ in every formally exponential subfield $K$ of the real numbers; however, $E(\sqrt{2})=a^\sqrt{2}$ is not algebraic if $1<a$ is algebraic by the Gelfond–Schneider theorem.
- Consequently, the class of formally exponential fields is not an elementary class since the field of real numbers and the field of real algebraic numbers are elementarily equivalent structures.
- The class of formally exponential fields is a pseudoelementary class. This is so since a field $K\,$ is exponentially closed if and only if there is a surjective function $E_2\colon K\rightarrow K^+$ such that $E_2(x+y)=E_2(x)E_2(y)$ and $E_2(1)=2$; and these properties of $E_2$ are axiomatizable.

== See also ==
- Exponential field
