= Alexey Leontiev =

Russian mathematician (1917–1987)

- Born: Alexey Fyodorovich Leontiev; March 27, 1917; Yakovtsevo, Vladimir Governorate, Russian Empire
- Died: April 14, 1987 (aged 70); Ufa, Bashkir ASSR, Soviet Union
- Education: N. I. Lobachevsky State University of Nizhny Novgorod
- Scientific career
- Fields: Mathematics

Alexey Fyodorovich Leontiev (Russian: Алексе́й Фёдорович Лео́нтьев; 27 March 1917 – 14 April 1987) was a Soviet scientist in the field of mathematics, professor, Member of the Academy of Sciences of the Soviet Union, laureate of the USSR State Prize (in 1989, posthumously).

== Biography ==
He was born in 1917 in the Nizhny Novgorod Governorate. Was the thirteenth child in a large peasant family.

In 1939, he graduated from the Gorky State University. After graduating from university, he continued his education in graduate school. In 1941, after the outbreak of World War II, he joined the militia and took part in the construction of fortifications around Gorky. In 1942-1954 he taught at the University of Gorky.

From 1954 to 1962, he worked at the Moscow Power Engineering Institute. From 1962 to 1971, he held the post of senior researcher at the Steklov Mathematical Institute of the Academy of Sciences of the USSR.

Since 1971, he worked at the mathematical faculty of the Bashkir State University. Under his leadership in Ufa, a mathematical scientific school on the theory of functions of a complex variable was formed.

Area of scientific interests: functions of a complex variable, sequences of polynomials in exponentials, questions of approximating solutions of convolution equations on the axis and in the complex domain by means of elementary solutions, the theory of equations of infinite order. He created a direction of mathematics on the study of the properties of sequences of polynomials in exponentials, a theory of representations of arbitrary analytic functions by exponential series was constructed.

He is the author of more than 120 scientific papers, including 3 monographs.

== Literature ==
- Differential-difference equations. // Mat. compilation, 24 (66): 3 (1949),
- Representation of functions by series of generalized exponentials. // Mat. compilation, 134 (176): 4 (12) (1987).
- Series of exponentials. // - Moscow, Science, 1976.
