= Hardy field =

Mathematical concept

In mathematics, a Hardy field is a field consisting of germs of real-valued functions at infinity that are closed under differentiation. They are named after the English mathematician G. H. Hardy.

== Definition ==
Initially at least, Hardy fields were defined in terms of germs of real functions at infinity. Specifically we consider a collection H of functions that are defined for all large real numbers, that is functions f that map (u,∞) to the real numbers R, for some real number u depending on f. Here and in the rest of the article we say a function has a property "eventually" if it has the property for all sufficiently large x, so for example we say a function f in H is eventually zero if there is some real number U such that f(x) = 0 for all x ≥ U. We can form an equivalence relation on H by saying f is equivalent to g if and only if f − g is eventually zero. The equivalence classes of this relation are called germs at infinity.

If H forms a field under the usual addition and multiplication of functions then so will H modulo this equivalence relation under the induced addition and multiplication operations. Moreover, if every function in H is eventually differentiable and the derivative of any function in H is also in H then H modulo the above equivalence relation is called a Hardy field.

Elements of a Hardy field are thus equivalence classes and should be denoted, say, [f]_{∞} to denote the class of functions that are eventually equal to the representative function f. However, in practice the elements are normally just denoted by the representatives themselves, so instead of [f]_{∞} one would just write f.

== Examples ==
If F is a subfield of R then we can consider it as a Hardy field by considering the elements of F as constant functions, that is by considering the number α in F as the constant function f_{α} that maps every x in R to α. This is a field since F is, and since the derivative of every function in this field is 0 which must be in F it is a Hardy field.

A less trivial example of a Hardy field is the field of rational functions on R, denoted R(x). This is the set of functions of the form P(x)/Q(x) where P and Q are polynomials with real coefficients. Since the polynomial Q can have only finitely many zeros by the fundamental theorem of algebra, such a rational function will be defined for all sufficiently large x, specifically for all x larger than the largest real root of Q. Adding and multiplying rational functions gives more rational functions, and the quotient rule shows that the derivative of rational function is again a rational function, so R(x) forms a Hardy field.

Another example is the field of functions that can be expressed using the standard arithmetic operations, exponents, and logarithms, and are well-defined on some interval of the form $(x,\infty)$. Such functions are sometimes called Hardy L-functions. Much bigger Hardy fields (that contain Hardy L-functions as a subfield) can be defined using transseries.

== Properties ==
Every element of a Hardy field is eventually either strictly positive, strictly negative, or zero. This follows fairly immediately from the facts that the elements in a Hardy field are eventually differentiable and hence continuous and eventually either have a multiplicative inverse or are zero. This means periodic functions such as the sine and cosine functions cannot exist in Hardy fields.

This avoidance of periodic functions also means that every element in a Hardy field has a (possibly infinite) limit at infinity, so if f is an element of H, then

$$\lim_{x\rightarrow\infty}f(x)$$

exists in R ∪ {−∞,+∞}.

It also means we can place an ordering on H by saying f < g if g − f is eventually strictly positive. This turns H into an ordered field. Note that f < g is not equivalent to the limit of f being less than the limit of g. For example, if we consider the germs of the identity function f(x) = x and the exponential function g(x) = e^{x} then since g(x) − f(x) > 0 for all x we have f < g. But they both tend to infinity. In this sense the ordering tells us how quickly all the unbounded functions diverge to infinity. Even finite limits being equal is not enough: consider f(x) = 1/x and g(x) = 0.

== In model theory ==
The modern theory of Hardy fields doesn't restrict to real functions but to those defined in certain structures expanding real closed fields. Indeed, if R is an o-minimal expansion of a field, then the set of unary definable functions in R that are defined for all sufficiently large elements forms a Hardy field denoted H(R). The properties of Hardy fields in the real setting still hold in this more general setting.
