= Exponential =

Exponential may refer to any of several mathematical topics related to exponentiation, including:

- Exponential function, also:
  - Matrix exponential, the matrix analogue to the above
- Exponential decay, decrease at a rate proportional to value
- Exponential discounting, a specific form of the discount function, used in the analysis of choice over time
- Exponential growth, where the growth rate of a mathematical function is proportional to the function's current value
- Exponential map (Riemannian geometry), in Riemannian geometry
- Exponential map (Lie theory), in Lie theory
- Exponential notation, also known as scientific notation, or standard form
- Exponential object, in category theory
- Exponential time, in complexity theory
- in probability and statistics:
  - Exponential distribution, a family of continuous probability distributions
  - Exponentially modified Gaussian distribution, describes the sum of independent normal and exponential random variables
  - Exponential family, a parametric set of probability distributions of a certain form
  - Exponential smoothing, a technique that can be applied to time series data
- Exponential type
  - Exponential type or function type, in type theory
  - Exponential type in complex analysis
- Topics listed at list of exponential topics

Exponential may also refer to:

- Exponential Technology, a vendor of PowerPC microprocessors

== See also ==
- Exponent (disambiguation)
