= Hahn series =

Mathematical formal infinite series

In mathematics, Hahn series (sometimes also known as Hahn–Mal'cev–Neumann series) are a type of formal infinite series. They are a generalization of Puiseux series (themselves a generalization of formal power series). They allow for arbitrary exponents of the indeterminate so long as the set supporting them forms a well-ordered subset of the value group (typically $\mathbb{Q}$ or $\mathbb{R}$).

Hahn series were first introduced, as groups, by Hans Hahn in 1907 in the course of the proof of the Hahn embedding theorem and then studied by him in relation to Hilbert's second problem. They were further generalized by Anatoly Maltsev and Bernhard Neumann to a non-commutative setting.

== Definition ==
The field of Hahn series $K\left[\left[T^\Gamma\right]\right]$ (in the indeterminate $T$) over a field $K$ and with value group $\Gamma$ (an ordered group, written additively) is the set of formal expressions of the form

$$f = \sum_{e\in\Gamma} c_e T^e$$

with $c_e \in K$ such that the support $\operatorname{supp} f:=\{ e\in \Gamma : c_e \neq 0 \}$ of f is a well-ordered subset of $\Gamma$. The sum and product of

$f = \sum_{e\in\Gamma} c_e T^e$ and $g = \sum_{e\in\Gamma} d_e T^e$

are given by

$$f+g = \sum_{e\in\Gamma} (c_e+d_e) T^e$$

and

$$fg = \sum_{e\in\Gamma} \left(\sum_{e'+e''=e} c_{e'} d_{e''}\right) T^e$$

(in the latter, the sum $\sum_{e'+e''=e}$ over values $(e',e'')$ such that $c_{e'} \neq 0$, $d_{e''} \neq 0$ and $e'+e''=e$ is finite because a well-ordered set cannot contain an infinite decreasing sequence).

== Examples ==
- The field $K((T))$ of formal Laurent series over $K$ is identical to the field of Hahn series $K[[T^\mathbb Z]]$.
- Given a prime number p, the series $f=T^{-1/p} + T^{-1/p^2} + T^{-1/p^3} + \cdots$ is a Hahn series in $K[[T^\mathbb Q]]$ because the set of rationals
  $\left\{-\frac{1}{p}, -\frac{1}{p^2}, -\frac{1}{p^3}, \ldots\right\}$ is well-ordered; it is not a Puiseux series because the denominators in the exponents are unbounded. (And if the base field K has characteristic p, then this Hahn series satisfies the equation $f^p-f = T^{-1}$, so it is algebraic over $K(T)$.)
- The field of surreal numbers can be regarded as a field of Hahn series with real coefficients and value group the surreal numbers themselves.
- The Levi-Civita field can be regarded as a subfield of $\mathbb{R}[[T^\mathbb{Q}]]$, with the additional imposition that the coefficients be a left-finite set: the set of coefficients less than a given coefficient $c_q$ is finite.
- The field of transseries $\mathbb{T}$ is a directed union of Hahn fields (and is an extension of the Levi-Civita field). The construction of $\mathbb{T}$ resembles (but is not literally) $T_0 = \mathbb{R}$, $T_{n+1} = \mathbb{R}\left[\left[\varepsilon^{T_n}\right]\right]$.

== Properties ==
=== Properties of the valued field ===
With the addition and multiplication defined above, $K\left[\left[T^\Gamma\right]\right]$ becomes a field. The valuation $v(f)$ of a non-zero Hahn series

$$f = \sum_{e\in\Gamma} c_e T^e$$

is defined as the smallest $e \in \Gamma$ such that $c_e \neq 0$ (in other words, the smallest element of the support of $f$): this makes $K[[T^\Gamma]]$ into a spherically complete valued field with value group $\Gamma$ and residue field $K$ (justifying a posteriori the terminology).

In fact, if $K$ has characteristic zero, then $(K[[T^{\Gamma}]],v)$ is up to (non-unique) isomorphism the only spherically complete valued field with residue field $K$ and value group $\Gamma$.

The valuation $v$ defines a topology on $K\left[\left[T^\Gamma\right]\right]$. If $\Gamma \subseteq \mathbb{R}$, then $v$ corresponds to an ultrametric absolute value $|f| = \exp(-v(f))$, with respect to which $K\left[\left[T^\Gamma\right]\right]$ is a complete metric space. However, unlike in the case of formal Laurent series or Puiseux series, the formal sums used in defining the elements of the field do not converge: in the case of $T^{-1/p} + T^{-1/p^2} + T^{-1/p^3} + \cdots$ for example, the absolute values of the terms tend to 1 (because their valuations tend to 0), so the series is not convergent (such series are sometimes known as "pseudo-convergent").

=== Algebraic properties ===
If $K$ is algebraically closed (but not necessarily of characteristic zero) and $\Gamma$ is divisible, then $K\left[\left[T^\Gamma\right]\right]$ is algebraically closed. Thus, the algebraic closure of $K((T))$ is contained in $\overline{K}[[T^{\mathbb{Q}}]]$, where $\overline{K}$ is the algebraic closure of $K$ (when $K$ is of characteristic zero, it is exactly the field of Puiseux series): in fact, it is possible to give a somewhat analogous description of the algebraic closure of $K((T))$ in positive characteristic as a subset of $K\left[\left[T^\Gamma\right]\right]$.

If $K$ is an ordered field then $K\left[\left[T^\Gamma\right]\right]$ is totally ordered by making the indeterminate $T$ infinitesimal (greater than 0 but less than any positive element of $K$) or, equivalently, by using the lexicographic order on the coefficients of the series. If $K$ is real-closed and $\Gamma$ is divisible then $K\left[\left[T^\Gamma\right]\right]$ is itself real-closed. This fact can be used to analyse (or even construct) the field of surreal numbers (which is isomorphic, as an ordered field, to the field of Hahn series with real coefficients and value group the surreal numbers themselves).

If κ is an infinite regular cardinal, one can consider the subset of $K\left[\left[T^\Gamma\right]\right]$ consisting of series whose support set $\{ e\in \Gamma : c_e \neq 0 \}$ has cardinality (strictly) less than κ: it turns out that this is also a field, with much the same algebraic closedness properties as the full $K\left[\left[T^\Gamma\right]\right]$: e.g., it is algebraically closed or real closed when $K$ is so and $\Gamma$ is divisible.

== Summable families ==
=== Summable families ===
One can define a notion of summable families in $K\left[\left[T^\Gamma\right]\right]$. If $I$ is a set and $(f_i)_{i \in I}$ is a family of Hahn series $f_i \in K\left[\left[T^\Gamma\right]\right]$, then we say that $(f_i)_{i \in I}$ is summable if the set $\bigcup \limits_{i \in I} \operatorname{supp} f_i \subset \Gamma$ is well-ordered, and each set $\{i \in I \mid e \in \operatorname{supp} f_i\}$ for $e \in \Gamma$ is finite.

We may then define the sum $\sum \limits_{i \in I} f_i$ as the Hahn series

$$\sum_{i \in I} f_i := \sum \limits_{e \in \Gamma} \left(\sum_{i \in I} f_i(e)\right) T^e.$$

If $(f_i)_{i \in I},(g_i)_{i \in I}$ are summable, then so are the families $(f_i+g_i)_{i \in I},(f_i g_j)_{(i,j) \in I \times I}$, and we have

$$\sum_{i \in I} f_i+g_i=\sum_{i \in I} f_i+\sum_{i \in I} g_i$$

and

$$\sum_{(i,j) \in I \times I} f_i g_j = \left(\sum_{i \in I} f_i\right)\left(\sum_{i \in I} g_i\right).$$

This notion of summable family does not correspond to the notion of convergence in the valuation topology on $K\left[\left[T^\Gamma\right]\right]$. For instance, in $\mathbb{Q}\left[\left[T^\mathbb{Q}\right]\right]$, the family $(T^{\frac{n}{n+1}}+T^{n+1})_{n \in \mathbb{N}}$ is summable but the sequence $\big(\sum \limits_{k \leq n} T^{\frac{k}{k+1}}+T^{k+1}\big)_{n \in \mathbb{N}}$ does not converge.

=== Evaluating analytic functions ===
Let $a \in \mathbb{R}$ and let $\mathcal{A}_a$ denote the ring of real-valued functions which are analytic on a neighborhood of $a$.

If $K$ contains $\mathbb{R}$, then we can evaluate every element $f$ of $\mathcal{A}_a$ at every element of $K\left[\left[T^\Gamma\right]\right]$ of the form $a+\varepsilon$, where the valuation of $\varepsilon$ is strictly positive. Indeed, the family $\bigg(\frac{f^{(n)}(a)}{n!}\varepsilon^n\bigg)_{\!n \in \mathbb{N}}$ is always summable, so we can define $f(a+\varepsilon):=\sum \limits_{n \in \mathbb{N}} \frac{f^{(n)}(a)}{n!}\varepsilon^n$. This defines a ring homomorphism $\mathcal{A}_a \longrightarrow K\left[\left[T^\Gamma\right]\right]$.

== Hahn–Witt series ==
The construction of Hahn series can be combined with Witt vectors (at least over a perfect field) to form twisted Hahn series or Hahn–Witt series: for example, over a finite field K of characteristic p (or their algebraic closure), the field of Hahn–Witt series with value group Γ (containing the integers) would be the set of formal sums $\sum_{e\in\Gamma} c_e p^e$ where now $c_e$ are Teichmüller representatives (of the elements of K) which are multiplied and added in the same way as in the case of ordinary Witt vectors (which is obtained when Γ is the group of integers). When Γ is the group of rationals or reals and K is the algebraic closure of the finite field with p elements, this construction gives a (ultra)metrically complete algebraically closed field containing the p-adics, hence a more or less explicit description of the field $\mathbb{C}_p$ or its spherical completion.

== See also ==
- Rational series
