= Transseries =

Mathematical field

In mathematics, the field $\mathbb{T}^{LE}$ of logarithmic-exponential transseries is a non-Archimedean ordered differential field which extends comparability of asymptotic growth rates of elementary nontrigonometric functions to a much broader class of objects. Each log-exp transseries represents a formal asymptotic behavior, and it can be manipulated formally, and when it converges (or in every case if using special semantics such as through infinite surreal numbers), corresponds to actual behavior. Transseries can also be convenient for representing functions. Through their inclusion of exponentiation and logarithms, transseries are a strong generalization of the power series at infinity ($\sum_{n=0}^\infty \frac{a_n}{x^n}$) and other similar asymptotic expansions.

The field $\mathbb{T}^{LE}$ was introduced independently by Dahn-Göring and Ecalle in the respective contexts of model theory or exponential fields and of the study of analytic singularity and proof by Ecalle of the Dulac conjectures. It constitutes a formal object, extending the field of exp-log functions of Hardy and the field of accelerando-summable series of Ecalle.

The field $\mathbb{T}^{LE}$ enjoys a rich structure: an ordered field with a notion of generalized series and sums, with a compatible derivation with distinguished antiderivation, compatible exponential and logarithm functions and a notion of formal composition of series.

== Examples and counter-examples ==
Informally speaking, exp-log transseries are well-based (i.e. reverse well-ordered) formal Hahn series of real powers of the positive infinite indeterminate $x$, exponentials, logarithms and their compositions, with real coefficients. Two important additional conditions are that the exponential and logarithmic depth of an exp-log transseries $f,$ that is the maximal numbers of iterations of exp and log occurring in $f,$ must be finite.

The following formal series are log-exp transseries:

$$\sum_{n=1}^\infty \frac{e^{x^{\frac{1}{n}}}}{n!} + x^3 + \log x + \log\log x +\sum_{n=0}^\infty x^{-n} + \sum _{i=1}^\infty e^{-\sum_{j=1}^\infty e^{ix^2-jx}}.$$
$$\sum_{m,n \in \N} x^{\frac{1}{m+1}}e^{-(\log x)^n}.$$

The following formal series are not log-exp transseries:

$\sum_{n \in \N} x^n$ — this series is not well-based.
$\log x + \log \log x+ \log \log \log x+ \cdots$ — the logarithmic depth of this series is infinite
$\frac{1}{2}x+e^{\frac{1}{2}\log x}+e^{e^{\frac{1}{2}\log \log x}}+\cdots$ — the exponential and logarithmic depths of this series are infinite

It is possible to define differential fields of transseries containing the two last series; they belong respectively to $\mathbb{T}^{EL}$ and $\R\langle\langle \omega \rangle\rangle$ (see the paragraph Using surreal numbers below).

== Introduction ==
A remarkable fact is that asymptotic growth rates of elementary nontrigonometric functions and even all functions definable in the model theoretic structure $(\mathbb{R},+,\times,<,\exp)$ of the ordered exponential field of real numbers are all comparable: For all such $f$ and $g$, we have $f \leq_{\infty} g$ or $g \leq_{\infty} f$, where $f\leq_{\infty}g$ means $\exists x. \forall y>x. f(y)\leq g(y)$. The equivalence class of $f$ under the relation $f \leq_{\infty} g \wedge g \leq_{\infty} f$ is the asymptotic behavior of $f$, also called the germ of $f$ (or the germ of $f$ at infinity).

The field of transseries can be intuitively viewed as a formal generalization of these growth rates: In addition to the elementary operations, transseries are closed under "limits" for appropriate sequences with bounded exponential and logarithmic depth. However, a complication is that growth rates are non-Archimedean and hence do not have the least upper bound property. We can address this by associating a sequence with the least upper bound of minimal complexity, analogously to construction of surreal numbers. For example, $(\sum_{k=0}^n x^{-k})_{n \in \mathbb{N}}$ is associated with $\sum_{k=0}^\infty x^{-k}$ rather than $\sum_{k=0}^\infty x^{-k}-e^{-x}$ because $e^{-x}$ decays too quickly, and if we identify fast decay with complexity, it has greater complexity than necessary (also, because we care only about asymptotic behavior, pointwise convergence is not dispositive).

Because of the comparability, transseries do not include oscillatory growth rates (such as $\sin x$). On the other hand, there are transseries such as $\sum _{k \in \mathbb{N}} k!e^{x^{-\frac{k}{k+1}}}$ that do not directly correspond to convergent series or real valued functions. Another limitation of transseries is that each of them is bounded by a tower of exponentials, i.e. a finite iteration $e^{e^{.^{.^{.^{e^x}}}}}$ of $e^x$, thereby excluding tetration and other transexponential functions, i.e. functions which grow faster than any tower of exponentials. There are ways to construct fields of generalized transseries including formal transexponential terms, for instance formal solutions $e_{\omega}$ of the Abel equation $e^{e_{\omega}(x)}=e_{\omega}(x+1)$.

== Formal construction ==
Transseries can be defined as formal (potentially infinite) expressions, with rules defining which expressions are valid, comparison of transseries, arithmetic operations, and even differentiation. Appropriate transseries can then be assigned to corresponding functions or germs, but there are subtleties involving convergence. Even transseries that diverge can often be meaningfully (and uniquely) assigned actual growth rates (that agree with the formal operations on transseries) using accelero-summation, which is a generalization of Borel summation.

Transseries can be formalized in several equivalent ways; we use one of the simplest ones here.

A transseries is a well-based sum,

$$\sum a_i m_i,$$

with finite exponential depth, where each $a_i$ is a nonzero real number and $m_i$ is a monic transmonomial ($a_i m_i$ is a transmonomial but is not monic unless the coefficient $a_i = 1$; each $m_i$ is different; the order of the summands is irrelevant).

The sum might be infinite or transfinite; it is usually written in the order of decreasing $m_i$.

Here, well-based means that there is no infinite ascending sequence $m_{i_1} < m_{i_2} < m_{i_3} < \cdots$ (see well-ordering).

A monic transmonomial is one of 1, x, log x, log log x, ..., e^{purely_large_transseries}.

Note: Because $x^n = e^{n \log x}$, we do not include it as a primitive, but many authors do; log-free transseries do not include $\log$ but $x^n e^\cdots$ is permitted. Also, circularity in the definition is avoided because the purely_large_transseries (above) will have lower exponential depth; the definition works by recursion on the exponential depth. See "Log-exp transseries as iterated Hahn series" (below) for a construction that uses $x^a e^\cdots$ and explicitly separates different stages.

A purely large transseries is a nonempty transseries $\sum a_i m_i$ with every $m_i>1$.

Transseries have finite exponential depth, where each level of nesting of e or log increases depth by 1 (so we cannot have x + log x + log log x + ...).

Addition of transseries is termwise: $\sum a_i m_i + \sum b_i m_i = \sum(a_i + b_i) m_i$ (absence of a term is equated with a zero coefficient).

Comparison:

The most significant term of $\sum a_i m_i$ is $a_i m_i$ for the largest $m_i$ (because the sum is well-based, this exists for nonzero transseries). $\sum a_i m_i$ is positive iff the coefficient of the most significant term is positive (this is why we used 'purely large' above). X > Y iff X − Y is positive.

Comparison of monic transmonomials:

$x = e^{\log x}, \log x = e^{\log \log x}, \ldots$ – these are the only equalities in our construction.
$$x > \log x > \log \log x > \cdots >1 >0.$$
$e^a < e^b$ iff $a < b$ (also $e^0 = 1$).

Multiplication:

$$e^a e^b = e^{a+b}$$
$$\left(\sum a_i x_i\right) \left(\sum b_j y_j\right) = \sum_k \left( \sum_{i,j\,:\,z_k=x_i y_j} a_i b_j\right) z_k.$$

This essentially applies the distributive law to the product; because the series is well-based, the inner sum is always finite.

Differentiation:

$$\left(\sum a_i x_i\right)' = \sum a_i x_i'$$
$$1' = 0, x' = 1$$
$$(e^y)' = y' e^y$$
$(\log y)' = y'/y$ (division is defined using multiplication).

With these definitions, transseries is an ordered differential field. Transseries is also a valued field, with the valuation $\nu$ given by the leading monic transmonomial, and the corresponding asymptotic relation defined for $0\neq f,g \in \mathbb{T}^{LE}$ by $f \prec g$ if $\forall 0<r \in \R, |f| < r |g|$ (where $|f|=\max(f,-f)$ is the absolute value).

== Other constructions ==
=== Log-exp transseries as iterated Hahn series ===
==== Log-free transseries ====
We first define the subfield $\mathbb{T}^{E}$ of $\mathbb{T}^{LE}$ of so-called log-free transseries. Those are transseries which exclude any logarithmic term.

Inductive definition:

For $n \in \N,$ we will define a linearly ordered multiplicative group of monomials $\mathfrak{M}_n$. We then let $\mathbb{T}^E_n$ denote the field of well-based series $\R[[\mathfrak{M}_n]]$. This is the set of maps $\R\to \mathfrak{M}_n$ with well-based (i.e. reverse well-ordered) support, equipped with pointwise sum and Cauchy product (see Hahn series). In $\mathbb{T}^E_n$, we distinguish the (non-unital) subring $\mathbb{T}^E_{n,\succ}$ of purely large transseries, which are series whose support contains only monomials lying strictly above $1$.

We start with $\mathfrak{M}_0=x^{\R}$ equipped with the product $x^a x^b:=x^{a+b}$ and the order $x^a \prec x^b \leftrightarrow a<b$.

If $n\in \N$ is such that $\mathfrak{M}_n$, and thus $\mathbb{T}^E_n$ and $\mathbb{T}^E_{n,\succ}$ are defined, we let $\mathfrak{M}_{n+1}$ denote the set of formal expressions $x^a e^{\theta}$ where $a \in \R$ and $\theta \in \mathbb{T}^E_{n,\succ}$. This forms a linearly ordered commutative group under the product $(x^a e^{\theta})(x^{a'} e^{\theta'})=(x^{a+a'}) e^{\theta+\theta'}$ and the lexicographic order $x^a e^{\theta} \prec x^{a'} e^{\theta'}$ if and only if $\theta<\theta'$ or ($\theta=\theta'$ and $a<a'$).

The natural inclusion of $\mathfrak{M}_0$ into $\mathfrak{M}_1$ given by identifying $x^a$ and $x^a e^0$ inductively provides a natural embedding of $\mathfrak{M}_n$ into $\mathfrak{M}_{n+1}$, and thus a natural embedding of $\mathbb{T}^E_n$ into $\mathbb{T}^E_{n+1}$. We may then define the linearly ordered commutative group $\mathfrak{M}=\bigcup_{n \in \N} \mathfrak{M}_n$ and the ordered field $\mathbb{T}^E=\bigcup_{n \in \N} \mathbb{T}^E_n$ which is the field of log-free transseries.

The field $\mathbb{T}^E$ is a proper subfield of the field $\R[[\mathfrak{M}]]$ of well-based series with real coefficients and monomials in $\mathfrak{M}$. Indeed, every series $f$ in $\mathbb{T}^E$ has a bounded exponential depth, i.e. the least positive integer $n$ such that $f \in \mathbb{T}^E_n$, whereas the series

$$e^{-x}+e^{-e^x}+e^{-e^{e^x}}+ \cdots \in \R[[\mathfrak{M}]]$$

has no such bound.

Exponentiation on $\mathbb{T}^E$:

The field of log-free transseries is equipped with an exponential function which is a specific morphism $\exp:(\mathbb{T}^E,+)\to(\mathbb{T}^{E,>}, \times)$. Let $f$ be a log-free transseries and let $n \in \N$ be the exponential depth of $f$, so $f \in \mathbb{T}^E_n$. Write $f$ as the sum $f=\theta+r+\varepsilon$ in $\mathbb{T}^E_n,$ where $\theta \in \mathbb{T}^E_{n,\succ}$, $r$ is a real number and $\varepsilon$ is infinitesimal (any of them could be zero). Then the formal Hahn sum

$$E(\varepsilon):=\sum_{k \in \N} \frac{\varepsilon^k}{k!}$$

converges in $\mathbb{T}^E_n$, and we define $\exp(f)=e^{\theta}\exp(r) E(\varepsilon) \in \mathbb{T}^E_{n+1}$ where $\exp(r)$ is the value of the real exponential function at $r$.

Right-composition with $e^x$:

A right composition $\circ_{e^x}$ with the series $e^x$ can be defined by induction on the exponential depth by

$$\left (\sum f_{\mathfrak{m}} \mathfrak{m} \right ) \circ e^x:=\sum f_{\mathfrak{m}} (\mathfrak{m} \circ e^x),$$

with $x^r \circ e^x:=e^{rx}$. It follows inductively that monomials are preserved by $\circ_{e^x},$ so at each inductive step the sums are well-based and thus well defined.

==== Log-exp transseries ====
Definition:

The function $\exp$ defined above is not onto $\mathbb{T}^{E,>}$ so the logarithm is only partially defined on $\mathbb{T}^E$: for instance the series $x$ has no logarithm. Moreover, every positive infinite log-free transseries is greater than some positive power of $x$. In order to move from $\mathbb{T}^E$ to $\mathbb{T}^{LE}$, one can simply "plug" into the variable $x$ of series formal iterated logarithms $\ell_n,n \in \N$ which will behave like the formal reciprocal of the $n$-fold iterated exponential term denoted $e_n$.

For $m,n \in \N,$ let $\mathfrak{M}_{m,n}$ denote the set of formal expressions $\mathfrak{u} \circ \ell_n$ where $\mathfrak{u} \in \mathfrak{M}_m$. We turn this into an ordered group by defining $(\mathfrak{u} \circ \ell_n)(\mathfrak{v} \circ \ell_n(x)):=(\mathfrak{u}\mathfrak{v}) \circ \ell_n$, and defining $\mathfrak{u} \circ \ell_n\prec \mathfrak{v}\circ \ell_n$ when $\mathfrak{u}\prec \mathfrak{v}$. We define $\mathbb{T}^{LE}_{m,n}:=\R[[\mathfrak{M}_{m,n}]]$. If $n'> n$ and $m' \geq m+(n'-n),$ we embed $\mathfrak{M}_{m,n}$ into $\mathfrak{M}_{m',n'}$ by identifying an element $\mathfrak{u} \circ \ell_n$ with the term

$$\left (\mathfrak{u} \circ \overbrace{e^x \circ \cdots \circ e^x}^{n'-n} \right ) \circ \ell_{n'}.$$

We then obtain $\mathbb{T}^{LE}$ as the directed union

$$\mathbb{T}^{LE}=\bigcup_{m,n \in \N} \mathbb{T}^{LE}_{m,n}.$$

On $\mathbb{T}^{LE},$ the right-composition $\circ_{\ell}$ with $\ell$ is naturally defined by

$$\mathbb{T}^{LE}_{m,n} \ni \left (\sum f_{\mathfrak{m} \circ \ell_n} \mathfrak{m} \circ \ell_n \right ) \circ \ell:= \sum f_{\mathfrak{m} \circ \ell_n} \mathfrak{m} \circ \ell_{n+1}\in \mathbb{T}^{LE}_{m,n+1}.$$

Exponential and logarithm:

Exponentiation can be defined on $\mathbb{T}^{LE}$ in a similar way as for log-free transseries, but here also $\exp$ has a reciprocal $\log$ on $\mathbb{T}^{LE,>}$. Indeed, for a strictly positive series $f \in \mathbb{T}^{LE,>}_{m,n}$, write $f=\mathfrak{m} r(1+\varepsilon)$ where $\mathfrak{m}$ is the dominant monomial of $f$ (largest element of its support), $r$ is the corresponding positive real coefficient, and $\varepsilon:=\frac{f}{\mathfrak{m} r}-1$ is infinitesimal. The formal Hahn sum

$$L(1+\varepsilon):=\sum_{k \in \N}\frac{(-\varepsilon)^k}{k+1}$$

converges in $\mathbb{T}^{LE}_{m,n}$. Write $\mathfrak{m}=\mathfrak{u}\circ \ell_n$ where $\mathfrak{u} \in \mathfrak{M}_m$ itself has the form $\mathfrak{u}=x^ae^{\theta}$ where $\theta \in \mathbb{T}^E_{m,\succ}$ and $a \in \R$. We define $\ell(\mathfrak{m}):=a \ell_{n+1} +\theta \circ \ell_n$. We finally set

$$\log(f):=\ell(\mathfrak{m})+\log(c)+L(1+\varepsilon) \in \mathbb{T}^{LE}_{m,n+1}.$$

=== Using surreal numbers ===
==== Direct construction of log-exp transseries ====
One may also define the field of log-exp transseries as a subfield of the ordered field $\mathbf{No}$ of surreal numbers. The field $\mathbf{No}$ is equipped with Gonshor-Kruskal's exponential and logarithm functions and with its natural structure of field of well-based series under Conway normal form.

Define $F^{LE}_0=\R(\omega)$, the subfield of $\mathbf{No}$ generated by $\R$ and the simplest positive infinite surreal number $\omega$ (which corresponds naturally to the ordinal $\omega$, and as a transseries to the series $x$). Then, for $n \in \N$, define $F^{LE}_{n+1}$ as the field generated by $F^{LE}_n$, exponentials of elements of $F^{LE}_n$ and logarithms of strictly positive elements of $F^{LE}_n$, as well as (Hahn) sums of summable families in $F^{LE}_n$. The union $F^{LE}_{\omega}=\bigcup_{n \in \N} F^{LE}_n$ is naturally isomorphic to $\mathbb{T}^{LE}$. In fact, there is a unique such isomorphism which sends $\omega$ to $x$ and commutes with exponentiation and sums of summable families in $F^{LE}_{\omega}$ lying in $F_{\omega}$.

==== Other fields of transseries ====
- Continuing this process by transfinite induction on $\mathbf{Ord}$ beyond $F^{LE}_{\omega}$, taking unions at limit ordinals, one obtains a proper class-sized field $\R\langle\langle\omega\rangle\rangle$ canonically equipped with a derivation and a composition extending that of $\mathbb{T}^{LE}$ (see Operations on transseries below).
- If instead of $F^{LE}_0$ one starts with the subfield $F^{EL}_0:=\R(\omega,\log \omega, \log \log \omega, \ldots)$ generated by $\R$ and all finite iterates of $\log$ at $\omega$, and for $n\in \N, F^{EL}_{n+1}$ is the subfield generated by $F^{EL}_n$, exponentials of elements of $F^{EL}_n$ and sums of summable families in $F^{EL}_n$, then one obtains an isomorphic copy the field $\mathbb{T}^{EL}$ of exponential-logarithmic transseries, which is a proper extension of $\mathbb{T}^{LE}$ equipped with a total exponential function.

The Berarducci-Mantova derivation on $\mathbf{No}$ coincides on $\mathbb{T}^{LE}$ with its natural derivation, and is unique to satisfy compatibility relations with the exponential ordered field structure and generalized series field structure of $\mathbb{T}^{EL}$ and $\R\langle\langle\omega\rangle\rangle.$

Contrary to $\mathbb{T}^{LE},$ the derivation in $\mathbb{T}^{EL}$ and $\R \langle\langle\omega\rangle\rangle$ is not surjective: for instance the series

$$\frac{1}{\omega \log \omega \log \log \omega \cdots}:=\exp(-(\log \omega+\log \log\omega+\log \log \log \omega+ \cdots)) \in \mathbb{T}^{EL}$$

doesn't have an antiderivative in $\mathbb{T}^{EL}$ or $\R \langle \langle\omega \rangle\rangle$ (this is linked to the fact that those fields contain no transexponential function).

== Additional properties ==
=== Operations on transseries ===
==== Operations on the differential exponential ordered field ====
Transseries have very strong closure properties, and many operations can be defined on transseries:

- Log-exp transseries form an exponentially closed ordered field: the exponential and logarithmic functions are total. For example:

$$\exp(x^{-1}) = \sum_{n=0}^\infty \frac{1}{n!}x^{-n} \quad \text{and} \quad \log(x+\ell)=\ell+\sum_{n=0}^{\infty} \frac{(x^{-1}\ell)^n}{n+1}.$$

- Logarithm is defined for positive arguments.
- Log-exp transseries are real-closed.
- Integration: every log-exp transseries $f$ has a unique antiderivative with zero constant term $F \in \mathbb{T}^{LE}$, $F'=f$ and $F_1=0$.
- Logarithmic antiderivative: for $f\in \mathbb{T}^{LE}$, there is $h\in \mathbb{T}^{LE}$ with $f'=f h'$.

Note 1. The last two properties mean that $\mathbb{T}^{LE}$ is Liouville closed.

Note 2. Just like an elementary nontrigonometric function, each positive infinite transseries $f$ has integral exponentiality, even in this strong sense:

$$\exists k,n \in \N: \quad \ell_{n-k} -1\leq \ell_n \circ f \leq \ell_{n-k}+1.$$

The number $k$ is unique, it is called the exponentiality of $f$.

==== Composition of transseries ====
An original property of $\mathbb{T}^{LE}$ is that it admits a composition $\circ :\mathbb{T}^{LE} \times \mathbb{T}^{LE,>,\succ} \to \mathbb{T}^{LE}$ (where $\mathbb{T}^{LE,>,\succ}$ is the set of positive infinite log-exp transseries) which enables us to see each log-exp transseries $f$ as a function on $\mathbb{T}^{LE,>,\succ}$. Informally speaking, for $g\in\mathbb{T}^{LE,>,\succ}$ and $f\in \mathbb{T}^{LE}$, the series $f \circ g$ is obtained by replacing each occurrence of the variable $x$ in $f$ by $g$.

===== Properties =====
- Associativity: for $f \in \mathbb{T}^{LE}$ and $g,h \in \mathbb{T}^{LE,>,\succ}$, we have $g\circ h \in \mathbb{T}^{LE,>,\succ}$ and $f \circ (g\circ h)=(f \circ g) \circ h$.
- Compatibility of right-compositions: For $g\in \mathbb{T}^{LE,>,\succ}$, the function $\circ_g:f\mapsto f \circ g$ is a field automorphism of $\mathbb{T}^{LE}$ which commutes with formal sums, sends $x$ onto $g$, $e^x$ onto $\exp(g)$ and $\ell$ onto $\log(g)$. We also have $\circ_x=\operatorname{id}_{\mathbb{T}^{LE}}$.
- Unicity: the composition is unique to satisfy the two previous properties.
- Monotonicity: for $f\in \mathbb{T}^{LE}$, the function $g\mapsto f \circ g$ is constant or strictly monotonous on $\mathbb{T}^{LE,>,\succ}$. The monotony depends on the sign of $f'$.
- Chain rule: for $f \in \mathbb{T}^{LE}\times$ and $g \in \mathbb{T}^{LE,>,\succ}$, we have $(f \circ g)'=g'f' \circ g$.
- Functional inverse: for $g \in \mathbb{T}^{LE,>,\succ}$, there is a unique series $h \in \mathbb{T}^{LE,>,\succ}$ with $g \circ h= h \circ g= x$.
- Taylor expansions: each log-exp transseries $f$ has a Taylor expansion around every point in the sense that for every $g\in \mathbb{T}^{LE,>,\succ}$ and for sufficiently small $\varepsilon \in \mathbb{T}^{LE}$, we have

$$f\circ (g+\varepsilon)=\sum_{k \in \N} \frac{f^{(k)}\circ g}{k!}\varepsilon^k$$

where the sum is a formal Hahn sum of a summable family.

- Fractional iteration: for $f \in \mathbb{T}^{LE,>,\succ}$ with exponentiality $0$ and any real number $a$, the fractional iterate $f^a$ of $f$ is defined.

=== Decidability and model theory ===
==== Theory of differential ordered valued differential field ====
The $\left\langle+,\times,\partial,<,\prec\right\rangle$ theory of $\mathbb{T}^{LE}$ is decidable and can be axiomatized as follows (this is Theorem 2.2 of Aschenbrenner et al.):

- $\mathbb{T}^{LE}$ is an ordered valued differential field.
- $f > 0 \wedge f \succ 1 \Longrightarrow f' > 0$
- $f \prec 1 \Longrightarrow f' \prec 1$
- $\forall f \exists g: \quad g' = f$
- $\forall f \exists h: \quad h' = fh$
- Intermediate value property (IVP):

$$P(f) < 0 \wedge P(g) > 0 \Longrightarrow \exists h: \quad P(h) = 0,$$

where P is a differential polynomial, i.e. a polynomial in $f, f', f'', \ldots, f^{(k)}.$

In this theory, exponentiation is essentially defined for functions (using differentiation) but not constants; in fact, every definable subset of $\R^n$ is semialgebraic.

==== Theory of ordered exponential field ====
The $\langle+,\times,\exp,< \rangle$ theory of $\mathbb{T}^{LE}$ is that of the exponential real ordered exponential field $(\R,+,\times,\exp,<)$, which is model complete by Wilkie's theorem.

=== Hardy fields ===
$\mathbb{T}_\mathrm{as}$ is the field of accelero-summable transseries, and using accelero-summation, we have the corresponding Hardy field, which is conjectured to be the maximal Hardy field corresponding to a subfield of $\mathbb{T}$. (This conjecture is informal since we have not defined which isomorphisms of Hardy fields into differential subfields of $\mathbb{T}$ are permitted.) $\mathbb{T}_\mathrm{as}$ is conjectured to satisfy the above axioms of $\mathbb{T}$. Without defining accelero-summation, we note that when operations on convergent transseries produce a divergent one while the same operations on the corresponding germs produce a valid germ, we can then associate the divergent transseries with that germ.

A Hardy field is said maximal if it is properly contained in no Hardy field. By an application of Zorn's lemma, every Hardy field is contained in a maximal Hardy field. It is conjectured that all maximal Hardy fields are elementary equivalent as differential fields, and indeed have the same first order theory as $\mathbb{T}^{LE}$. Logarithmic-transseries do not themselves correspond to a maximal Hardy field for not every transseries corresponds to a real function, and maximal Hardy fields always contain transexponential functions.

== See also ==
- Formal power series
- Hahn series
- Exponentially closed field
- Hardy field
