= The Exponent (Montana State University) =

The MSU Exponent
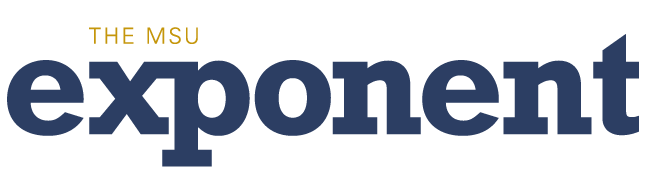
- Type: Weekly student newspaper
- Owner: Montana State University – Bozeman
- Editor-in-chief: Molly Houser
- Managing editor: Tatiana Means
- Campus chief: Bill Lamberty
- Founded: 1895
- Language: English
- Headquarters: Montana State University – Bozeman
- Website: msuexponent.com

The MSU Exponent has been the student-run newspaper of Montana State University – Bozeman since 1895. It is printed weekly on Thursdays during the academic year schedule and distributed on and around the university campus for free. The newspaper is divided into news, sports and outdoors, culture, and opinion. It is the oldest student organization on Montana State University – Bozeman's campus, predating the student government by 16 years.

== Location ==
The MSU Exponent office is located on the third floor of the Student Union Building (SUB) in Room 366.

== Former Titles ==
The MSU student newspaper has been known by a number of names during its history.

- College Exponent (1895-1901)
- The Exponent (1901-1910)
- Weekly Exponent (1910-1931)
- Montana Exponent (1931-1960)
- Exponent of Montana State College (1960-1965)
- Exponent of Montana State University (1965-1976)
- MSU Exponent (1976-1981)
- The Exponent (1981-1987)
- ASMSU Exponent (1987-2012)
- MSU Exponent (2012–present)

== Digital Archives ==
A partnership between the Exponent and the Montana State University library has made copies of the newspaper dating back to 1895 available online.

== Accolades ==
The paper was recognized nationally in 2022 as a finalist for the Associated Collegiate Press’s Newspaper Pacemaker Competition, the most prestigious in collegiate journalism. The Exponent was also recognized as a finalist in 2011. The Exponent also won two Best of Show awards from the Associated Collegiate Press at the National College Journalism Convention in 2012 and one in 2015, and has also received multiple awards from the Montana Newspaper Association (MNA). Recently, the Exponent won four awards in the MNA’s 2025 Better Newspaper Contest while competing one division higher than it would typically be placed based on weekly print circulation.
