= Tarski's exponential function problem =

In model theory, Tarski's exponential function problem asks whether the theory of the real numbers together with the exponential function is decidable. Alfred Tarski had previously shown that the theory of the real numbers (without the exponential function) is decidable.

== The problem ==
The ordered real field $\R$ is a structure over the language of ordered rings $L_{\text{or}}=(+,-,<,0,1)$, with the usual interpretation given to each symbol. It was proved by Tarski that the theory of the real field, $\operatorname{Th}(\R)$, is decidable. That is, given any $L_{\text{or}}$-sentence $\varphi$ there is an effective procedure for determining whether

$$\R\models\varphi.$$

He then asked whether this was still the case if one added a unary function $\exp$ to the language that was interpreted as the exponential function on $\R$, to get the structure $\R_{\exp}$.

== Conditional and equivalent results ==
The problem can be reduced to finding an effective procedure for determining whether any given exponential polynomial in $n$ variables and with coefficients in $\Z$ has a solution in $\R^n$. Macintyre & Wilkie (1996) showed that Schanuel's conjecture implies such a procedure exists, and hence gave a conditional solution to Tarski's problem. Schanuel's conjecture deals with all complex numbers so would be expected to be a stronger result than the decidability of $\R_{\exp}$, and indeed, Macintyre and Wilkie proved that only a real version of Schanuel's conjecture is required to imply the decidability of this theory.

Even the real version of Schanuel's conjecture is not a necessary condition for the decidability of the theory. In their paper, Macintyre and Wilkie showed that an equivalent result to the decidability of $\operatorname{Th}(\R_{\exp})$ is what they dubbed the weak Schanuel's conjecture. This conjecture states that there is an effective procedure that, given $n\ge 1$ and exponential polynomials in $n$ variables with integer coefficients $f_1,\dots, f_n, g$, produces an integer $\eta\ge 1$ that depends on $n, f_1,\dots, f_n, g$, and such that if $\alpha\in\R^n$ is a non-singular solution of the system

$$f_1(x_1,\ldots,x_n,e^{x_1},\ldots,e^{x_n})=\ldots=f_n(x_1,\ldots,x_n,e^{x_1},\ldots,e^{x_n})=0$$

then either $g(\alpha)=0$ or $|g(\alpha)|>\tfrac{1}{\eta}$.
