= Andrei Gabrielov =

Russian mathematician

Andrei Gabrielov is a mathematician who is a professor at Purdue University. He has been a fellow of the American Mathematical Society since 2016, for "contributions to real algebraic and analytic geometry, and the theory of singularities, and for contributions to geophysics."

He obtained his Ph.D. from Moscow State University in 1973.
