= Valuation (algebra) =

Function in algebra

In algebra (in particular in algebraic geometry or algebraic number theory), a valuation is a function on a field that provides a measure of the size or multiplicity of elements of the field. It generalizes to commutative algebra the notion of size inherent in consideration of the degree of a pole or multiplicity of a zero in complex analysis, the degree of divisibility of a number by a prime number in number theory, and the geometrical concept of contact between two algebraic or analytic varieties in algebraic geometry. In all of these examples, the valuation assumes integer values and is therefore called a discrete valuation, but in general, the integers are replaced by an abelian totally ordered group.

A field with a valuation on it is called a valued field.

== Definition ==
=== Discrete valuations ===
A discrete valuation on a field K is a function:

$$\nu:K\to\mathbb Z\cup\{\infty\}$$

satisfying the conditions:

$$\nu(x\cdot y)=\nu(x)+\nu(y)$$
$$\nu(x+y)\geq\min\big\{\nu(x),\nu(y)\big\}$$
$$\nu(x)=\infty\iff x=0$$

for all $x,y\in K$.

Note that often the trivial valuation which takes on only the values $0,\infty$ is explicitly excluded.

A field with a non-trivial discrete valuation is called a discrete valuation field.

=== Relation to discrete valuation rings ===
To every field $K$ with discrete valuation $\nu$ we can associate the subring

$$\mathcal{O}_\nu := \left\{ x \in K \mid \nu(x) \geq 0 \right\}$$

of $K$, which is a discrete valuation ring. Conversely, the valuation $\nu: A \rightarrow \Z\cup\{\infty\}$ on a discrete valuation ring $A$ can be extended in a unique way to a discrete valuation on the quotient field $K=\text{Quot}(A)$; the associated discrete valuation ring $\mathcal{O}_\nu$ is just $A$.

Discrete valuation rings $\mathcal{O}_\nu$ are local rings with maximal ideal

$$\mathfrak{m}_\nu := \left\{ x \in \mathcal{O}_\nu \mid \nu(x) > 0 \right\},$$

so there is a notion of residue field $\kappa=\mathcal{O}_\nu/\mathfrak{m}_\nu$. Some authors call $\mathcal{O}_\nu$ a local $K$-algebra when $\kappa$ and $K$ are isomorphic.

=== General (Krull) valuations ===
One starts with the following objects:

- a field K and its multiplicative group K^{×},
- an abelian totally ordered group (Γ, +, ≥).

The ordering and group law on Γ are extended to the set Γ ∪ {∞} (Note: The symbol ∞ denotes an element not in Γ, with no other meaning. Its properties are simply defined by the given axioms.) by the rules

- ∞ ≥ α for all α ∈ Γ,
- ∞ + α = α + ∞ = ∞ + ∞ = ∞ for all α ∈ Γ.

Then a valuation of K is any map

v : K → Γ ∪ {∞}

that satisfies the following properties for all a, b in K:

- v(a) = ∞ if and only if a = 0,
- v(ab) = v(a) + v(b),
- v(a + b) ≥ min(v(a), v(b)), with equality if v(a) ≠ v(b).

A valuation v is trivial if v(a) = 0 for all a in K^{×}, otherwise it is non-trivial.

The second property asserts that any valuation is a group homomorphism on K^{×}. The third property is a version of the triangle inequality on metric spaces adapted to an arbitrary Γ (see § Multiplicative notation below). For valuations used in geometric applications, the first property implies that any non-empty germ of an analytic variety near a point contains that point.

The valuation can be interpreted as the order of the leading-order term. (Note: With the min convention here, the valuation is rather interpreted as the negative of the order of the leading order term, but with the max convention it can be interpreted as the order.) The third property then corresponds to the order of a sum being the order of the larger term, (Note: Again, swapped since using minimum convention.) unless the two terms have the same order, in which case they may cancel and the sum may have larger order.

For many applications, Γ is an additive subgroup of the real numbers $\R$ (Note: Every Archimedean group is isomorphic to a subgroup of the real numbers under addition, but non-Archimedean ordered groups exist, such as the additive group of a non-Archimedean ordered field.) in which case ∞ can be interpreted as +∞ in the extended real numbers; note that $\min(a, +\infty) = \min(+\infty, a) = a$ for any real number a, and thus +∞ is the unit under the binary operation of minimum. The real numbers (extended by +∞) with the operations of minimum and addition form a semiring, called the min tropical semiring, (Note: In the tropical semiring, minimum and addition of real numbers are considered tropical addition and tropical multiplication; these are the semiring operations.) and a valuation v is almost a semiring homomorphism from K to the tropical semiring, except that the homomorphism property can fail when two elements with the same valuation are added together.

=== Associated objects ===
Similarly to the discrete case, there are several objects defined from a given valuation v : K → Γ ∪ {∞} ;

- the value group or valuation group Γ_{v} = v(K^{×}), a subgroup of Γ (though v is usually assumed surjective so that Γ_{v} = Γ),
- the valuation ring R_{v} is the set (subring) of a ∈ K with v(a) ≥ 0,
- the prime ideal m_{v} is the set of a ∈ K with v(a) > 0 (it is in fact a maximal ideal of R_{v}, and the only such),
- the residue field k_{v} = R_{v}/m_{v}.

=== Multiplicative notation and absolute values ===
The concept was developed by Emil Artin in his book Geometric Algebra writing the group in multiplicative notation as (Γ, ·, ≥):

Instead of ∞, we adjoin a formal symbol O to Γ, with the ordering and group law extended by the rules

- O ≤ α for all α ∈ Γ,
- O · α = α · O = O for all α ∈ Γ.

Then a valuation of K is any map

| ⋅ |_{v} : K → Γ ∪ {O}

satisfying the following properties for all a, b ∈ K:

- |a|_{v} = O if and only if a = 0,
- |ab|_{v} = |a|_{v} · |b|_{v},
- |a+b|_{v} ≤ max(|a|_{v}, |b|_{v}), with equality if |a|_{v} ≠ |b|_{v}.

(Note that the directions of the inequalities are reversed from those in the additive notation.)

If Γ is a subgroup of the positive real numbers under multiplication, the last condition is the ultrametric inequality, a stronger form of the triangle inequality |a+b|_{v} ≤ |a|_{v} + |b|_{v}, and | ⋅ |_{v} is an absolute value. In this case, we may pass to the additive notation with value group $\Gamma_+ \subseteq (\R, +)$ by taking v_{+}(a) = −log |a|_{v}.

Each valuation on K defines a corresponding linear preorder: a ≼ b ⇔ |a|_{v} ≤ |b|_{v}. Conversely, given a "≼" satisfying the required properties, we can define valuation |a|_{v} = {b: b ≼ a ∧ a ≼ b}, with multiplication and ordering based on K and ≼.

=== Terminology ===
In this article, we use the terms defined above, in the additive notation. However, some authors use alternative terms:

- our "valuation" (satisfying the ultrametric inequality) is called an "exponential valuation" or "non-Archimedean absolute value" or "ultrametric absolute value";
- our "absolute value" (satisfying the triangle inequality) is called a "valuation" or an "Archimedean absolute value".

== Basic properties ==
=== Equivalence of valuations and relation to valuation rings ===
Two valuations v_{1} and v_{2} of K with valuation group Γ_{1} and Γ_{2}, respectively, are said to be equivalent if there is an order-preserving group isomorphism φ : Γ_{1} → Γ_{2} such that v_{2}(a) = φ(v_{1}(a)) for all a in K^{×}. This is an equivalence relation.

Two valuations of K are equivalent if and only if they have the same valuation ring. On the other hand, any valuation ring O of K is the valuation ring of a canonical valuation v : K → Γ ∪ {∞} , where Γ = K^{×}/O^{×}, an abelian group linearly ordered by xO^{×} ≤ yO^{×} whenever y/x ∈ O, and v is the quotient map v(x) = xO^{×}.

An equivalence class of valuations of a field is called a place. Ostrowski's theorem gives a complete classification of places of the field of rational numbers $\Q:$ these are precisely the equivalence classes of valuations for the p-adic completions of $\Q.$

=== Extension of valuations ===
Let v be a valuation of K and let L be a field extension of K. An extension of v (to L) is a valuation w of L such that the restriction of w to K is v. The set of all such extensions is studied in the ramification theory of valuations.

Let L/K be a finite extension and let w be an extension of v to L. The index of Γ_{v} in Γ_{w}, e(w/v) = [Γ_{w} : Γ_{v}], is called the reduced ramification index of w over v. It satisfies e(w/v) ≤ [L : K] (the degree of the extension L/K). The relative degree of w over v is defined to be f(w/v) = [R_{w}/m_{w} : R_{v}/m_{v}] (the degree of the extension of residue fields). It is also less than or equal to the degree of L/K. When L/K is separable, the ramification index of w over v is defined to be e(w/v)p^{i}, where p^{i} is the inseparable degree of the extension R_{w}/m_{w} over R_{v}/m_{v}.

=== Complete valued fields ===
When the ordered abelian group Γ is the additive group of the integers, the associated valuation is equivalent to an absolute value, and hence induces a metric on the field K. If K is complete with respect to this metric, then it is called a complete valued field. If K is not complete, one can use this metric to construct its Cauchy completion and obtain a unique valuation extending the one on K, as in the examples below; different valuations can define different completion fields.

In general, a valuation induces a uniform structure on K, and K is called a complete valued field if it is complete as a uniform space. There is a related property known as spherical completeness: it is equivalent to completeness if $\Gamma = \Z,$ but stronger in general.

== Examples ==
=== p-adic valuation ===
An elementary example is the p-adic valuation ν_{p} associated to a prime integer p, on the rational numbers $K=\Q,$ with valuation ring $R=\Z_{(p)},$ where $\Z_{(p)}$ is the localization of $\Z$ at the prime ideal $(p)$. The valuation group is the additive integers $\Gamma = \Z;$ the residue field is $k=\Z_{(p)}/p\Z_{(p)}\cong\Z/p\Z.$ For an integer $a \in R= \Z,$ the valuation ν_{p}(a) measures the divisibility of a by powers of p:

$$\nu_p(a) = \max\{e \in \Z \mid p^e \text{ divides } a\};$$

and for a fraction, ν_{p}(a/b) = ν_{p}(a) − ν_{p}(b).

Writing this multiplicatively yields the p-adic absolute value, which conventionally has as base $1/p = p^{-1}$, so $|a|_p := p^{-\nu_p(a)}$.

The completion of $\Q$ with respect to ν_{p} is the field $\Q_p$ of p-adic numbers.

The p-adic valuation on $\Q_p$ extends uniquely to its algebraic closure $\overline{\Q_p}$, which has valuation group $\Gamma=\Q$ and the integral closure of $\Z_p$ as its valuation ring. Hence, $\C_p$, the completion of $\overline{\Q_p}$ (which is again algebraically closed), also has valuation group $\Q$.

=== Order of vanishing ===
Given a Riemann surface $X$, we can consider the field $K=M(X)$ of meromorphic functions $X\to\Complex\cup\{\infin\}$. For a fixed point $p\in X$, we define a discrete valuation on $K$ as follows: $\nu(f)=j$ if and only if $j$ is the largest integer such that the function $f(z)/(z-p)^j$ can be extended to a holomorphic function at $p$. This means: if $\nu(f)=j>0$ then $f$ has a root of order $j$ at the point $p$; if $\nu(f)=j<0$ then $f$ has a pole of order $-j$ at $p$. In a similar manner, one also defines a discrete valuation on the function field of an algebraic curve for every regular point $p$ on the curve.

Let K = F(x), the rational functions on the affine line X = F^{1}, and take a point a ∈ X. For a polynomial $f(x) = a_k (x{-}a)^k + a_{k+1}(x{-}a)^{k+1}+\cdots+ a_n(x{-}a)^n$ with $a_k\neq 0$, define v_{a}(f) = k, the order of vanishing at x = a; and v_{a}(f /g) = v_{a}(f) − v_{a}(g). Then the valuation ring R consists of rational functions with no pole at x = a, and the completion is the formal Laurent series ring F((x−a)). This can be generalized to the field of Puiseux series K{{t}} (fractional powers), the Levi-Civita field (its Cauchy completion), and the field of Hahn series, with valuation in all cases returning the smallest exponent of t appearing in the series.

=== π-adic valuation ===
Generalizing the previous examples, let R be a principal ideal domain, K be its field of fractions, and π be an irreducible element of R. Since every principal ideal domain is a unique factorization domain, every non-zero element a of R can be written (essentially) uniquely as

$$a=\pi^{e_a}p_1^{e_1}p_2^{e_2}\cdots p_n^{e_n}$$

where the e_{i} are non-negative integers and the p_{i} are irreducible elements of R that are not associates of π. In particular, the integer e_{a} is uniquely determined by a.

The π-adic valuation of K is then given by

- $v_\pi(0)=\infty$
- $v_\pi(a/b)=e_a-e_b,\text{ for }a,b\in R, a, b\neq0.$

If π' is another irreducible element of R such that (π') = (π) (that is, they generate the same ideal in R), then the π-adic valuation and the π'-adic valuation are equal. Thus, the π-adic valuation can be called the P-adic valuation, where P = (π). Its valuation ring is R_{P}.

=== P-adic valuation on a Dedekind domain ===
The previous example can be generalized to Dedekind domains. Let R be a Dedekind domain, K its field of fractions, and let P be a non-zero prime ideal of R. Then, the localization of R at P, denoted R_{P}, is a principal ideal domain whose field of fractions is K. The construction of the previous section applied to the prime ideal PR_{P} of R_{P} yields the P-adic valuation of K.

For instance, if R is the ring of integers of an algebraic number field K, the completion of K with respect to a P-adic valuation is a finite extension of $\Q_p$ for the prime number p with $P\cap\Q=(p)$, a (non-Archimedean) local field.

== Vector spaces over valuation fields ==
Suppose that Γ ∪ {0} is the set of non-negative real numbers under multiplication. Then we say that the valuation is non-discrete if its range (the valuation group) is infinite (and hence has an accumulation point at 0).

Suppose that X is a vector space over K and that A and B are subsets of X. Then we say that A absorbs B if there exists a α ∈ K such that λ ∈ K and |λ| ≥ |α| implies that B ⊆ λ A. A is called radial or absorbing if A absorbs every finite subset of X. Radial subsets of X are invariant under finite intersection. Also, A is called circled if λ in K and |λ| ≥ |α| implies λ A ⊆ A. The set of circled subsets of L is invariant under arbitrary intersections. The circled hull of A is the intersection of all circled subsets of X containing A.

Suppose that X and Y are vector spaces over a non-discrete valuation field K, let A ⊆ X, B ⊆ Y, and let f : X → Y be a linear map. If B is circled or radial then so is $f^{-1}(B)$. If A is circled then so is f(A) but if A is radial then f(A) will be radial under the additional condition that f is surjective.

== See also ==
- Euclidean valuation
- Field norm
- Absolute value (algebra)
