= Spherically complete field =

Mathematical term

In mathematics, a field K with an absolute value is called spherically complete if the intersection of every decreasing sequence of balls (in the sense of the metric induced by the absolute value) is nonempty:

$$B_1\supseteq B_2\supseteq \cdots \Rightarrow\bigcap_{n\in {\mathbf N}} B_n\neq \empty.$$

The definition can be adapted also to a field K with a valuation v taking values in an arbitrary ordered abelian group: (K,v) is spherically complete if every collection of balls that is totally ordered by inclusion has a nonempty intersection.

Spherically complete fields are important in nonarchimedean functional analysis, since many results analogous to theorems of classical functional analysis require the base field to be spherically complete.

== Examples ==
- Any locally compact field is spherically complete. This includes, in particular, the fields Q_{p} of p-adic numbers, and any of their finite extensions.
- Every spherically complete field is complete. On the other hand, C_{p}, the completion of the algebraic closure of Q_{p}, is not spherically complete.
- Any field of Hahn series is spherically complete.
