= Exponential field =

Mathematical field with an extra operation

In mathematics, an exponential field is a field with a further unary operation that is a homomorphism from the field's additive group to its multiplicative group. This generalizes the usual idea of exponentiation on the real numbers, where the base is a chosen positive real number.

== Definition ==
A field is an algebraic structure composed of a set of elements $F$ and two binary operations, addition ($+$) and multiplication ($\cdot$), such that $F$ forms an abelian group under addition with identity $0_F$ and $F$ excluding $0_F$ forms an abelian group under multiplication with identity $1_F$. Moreover, multiplication is distributive over addition; that is, for any elements $a,b,c$ in $F$, one has

$$a\cdot(b+c)=a\cdot b+a\cdot c$$.

If there is also a function $E$ that maps $F$ into $F$, and such that for every $a$ and $b$ in $F$ one has

$$\begin{align}&E(a+b)=E(a)\cdot E(b),\\&E(0_F)=1_F, \end{align}$$

then $F$ is called an exponential field, and the function $E$ is called an exponential function on $F$. Thus an exponential function on a field is a homomorphism between the additive group of $F$ and its multiplicative group.

== Trivial exponential function ==
There is a trivial exponential function on any field, namely, the map that sends every element to the identity element of the field under multiplication. Thus, every field is trivially an exponential field, so the cases of interest to mathematicians occur when the exponential function is non-trivial.

Exponential fields are sometimes required to have characteristic zero as the only exponential function on a field with nonzero characteristic is the trivial one. To see this, first note that for any element $x$ in a field $F$ with characteristic $p>0$,

$$1=E(0)=E(\underbrace{x+x+\cdots+x}_{p\text{ times}})=E(x)E(x)\cdots E(x)=E(x)^p.$$

Hence

$$E(x)^p-1=E(x)^p-1^p=(E(x)-1)^p=0$$

and so $E(x)=1$ for all $x$ in $F$.

== Examples ==
- The field of real numbers $\R$, formally $(\R,+,\cdot,0,1)$, has infinitely many exponential functions. One such function is the usual exponential function $E(x)=e^x$, since we have $e^{x+y}=e^xe^y$ and $e^0=1$ as required. Considering the ordered field $\R$ equipped with this function gives the ordered real exponential field, denoted $\R_{\text{exp}}=(\R,+,\cdot,<,0,1,\operatorname{exp})$.
- Any real number $a>0$ gives an exponential function on $\R$, where the map $E(x)=a^x$ satisfies the required properties.
- Analogously to the real exponential field, there is the complex exponential field, $\C_{\text{exp}}=(\C,+,\cdot,0,1,\operatorname{exp})$. However, this field is not ordered.
- Boris Zilber constructed an exponential field that, crucially, satisfies the equivalent formulation of Schanuel's conjecture with the field's exponential function. It is conjectured that this exponential field is actually $\C_{\text{exp}}$, and a proof of this fact would thus prove Schanuel's conjecture.

== Exponential rings ==
The underlying set $F$ may not be required to be a field but instead allowed to simply be a ring, $R$, and concurrently the exponential function is relaxed to be a homomorphism from the additive group in $R$ to the multiplicative group of units $R^\times$. The resulting object is called an exponential ring.

An example of an exponential ring with a non-trivial exponential function is the ring of integers $\Z$ equipped with the function $E$ which takes the value $1$ at even integers and $-1$ at odd integers, i.e., the function $n \mapsto (-1)^n$. This exponential function, and the trivial one, are the only two functions on $\Z$ that satisfy the conditions.

== Open problems ==
Exponential fields are much-studied objects in model theory, occasionally providing a link between it and number theory as in the case of Zilber's work on Schanuel's conjecture. It was proved in the 1990s that $\R_{\text{exp}}$ is model complete, a result known as Wilkie's theorem. This result, when combined with Khovanskii's theorem on Pfaffian functions, proves that $\R_{\text{exp}}$ is also o-minimal. On the other hand, it is known that $\C_{\text{exp}}$ is not model complete. The question of decidability is still unresolved. Alfred Tarski posed the question of the decidability of $\R_{\text{exp}}$ and hence it is now known as Tarski's exponential function problem. It is known that if the real version of Schanuel's conjecture is true then $\R_{\text{exp}}$ is decidable.

== See also ==
- Ordered exponential field
