= Exponential polynomial =

In mathematics, exponential polynomials are functions on fields, rings, or abelian groups that take the form of polynomials in a variable and an exponential function.

== Definition ==
=== In fields ===
An exponential polynomial generally has both a variable x and some kind of exponential function E(x). In the complex numbers there is already a canonical exponential function, the function that maps x to e^{x}. In this setting the term exponential polynomial is often used to mean polynomials of the form P(x, e^{x}) where P ∈ C[x, y] is a polynomial in two variables.

There is nothing particularly special about C here; exponential polynomials may also refer to such a polynomial on any exponential field or exponential ring with its exponential function taking the place of e^{x} above. Similarly, there is no reason to have one variable, and an exponential polynomial in n variables would be of the form P(x_{1}, ..., x_{n}, e^{x_{1}}, ..., e^{x_{n}}), where P is a polynomial in 2n variables.

For formal exponential polynomials over a field K we proceed as follows. Let W be a finitely generated Z-submodule of K and consider finite sums of the form

$$\sum_{i=1}^{m} f_i(X) \exp(w_i X) \ ,$$

where the f_{i} are polynomials in K[X] and the exp(w_{i} X) are formal symbols indexed by w_{i} in W subject to exp(u + v) = exp(u) exp(v).

=== In abelian groups ===
A more general framework where the term 'exponential polynomial' may be found is that of exponential functions on abelian groups. Similarly to how exponential functions on exponential fields are defined, given a topological abelian group G a homomorphism from G to the additive group of the complex numbers is called an additive function, and a homomorphism to the multiplicative group of nonzero complex numbers is called an exponential function, or simply an exponential. A product of additive functions and exponentials is called an exponential monomial, and a linear combination of these is then an exponential polynomial on G.

== Properties ==
Ritt's theorem states that the analogues of unique factorization and the factor theorem hold for the ring of exponential polynomials.

=== Zero sets and geometry ===
Zero sets of exponential polynomials give rise to a class of geometric objects that generalize real algebraic sets. Given exponential polynomials $f_1,\dots,f_k \colon \mathbb{R}^n \to \mathbb{R}$, their common zero set $\{x \in \mathbb{R}^n \mid f_1(x)=\cdots=f_k(x)=0\}$ is sometimes referred to as an exponential algebraic set.

These sets extend the notion of real algebraic sets by allowing defining equations that involve both polynomial terms and exponentials of polynomials. Although they are generally neither algebraic nor semialgebraic, they retain a number of structural features familiar from real algebraic geometry. In particular, notions such as irreducibility and decomposition into finitely many components admit meaningful analogues in this setting.

From a computational perspective, zero sets of exponential polynomials have been studied in connection with real decision problems and complexity theory. From a computational perspective, zero sets of exponential polynomials have been studied in connection with real decision problems and complexity theory. Algorithms for computing irreducible components of real solution sets defined by exponential–polynomial equations have been developed, together with complexity bounds in fixed dimension and especially the case of real exponential hypersurfaces, is well understood. Related classes of exponential–polynomial equations also appear in the study of Pfaffian functions and tame real geometry, where finiteness and structural results play an important role.

== Applications ==
Exponential polynomials on R and C often appear in transcendental number theory, where they appear as auxiliary functions in proofs involving the exponential function. They also act as a link between model theory and analytic geometry. If one defines an exponential variety to be the set of points in R^{n} where some finite collection of exponential polynomials vanish, then results like Khovanskiǐ's theorem in differential geometry and Wilkie's theorem in model theory show that these varieties are well-behaved in the sense that the collection of such varieties is stable under the various set-theoretic operations as long as one allows the inclusion of the image under projections of higher-dimensional exponential varieties. Indeed, the two aforementioned theorems imply that the set of all exponential varieties forms an o-minimal structure over R.

Exponential polynomials also appear in the characteristic equation associated with linear delay differential equations.

== See also ==
- Quasi-polynomial
