= Pfaffian function =

Type of mathematical function

In mathematics, Pfaffian functions are a certain class of functions whose derivative can be written in terms of the original function. They were originally introduced by Askold Khovanskii in the 1970s, but are named after German mathematician Johann Pfaff.

== Motivation ==
Some functions, when differentiated, give a result which can be written in terms of the original function. Perhaps the simplest example is the exponential function, $f(x)=e^x$. If we differentiate this function, we get $e^x$ again; that is,

$$f'(x) = e^x = f(x).$$

Another example is the reciprocal function, $g(x)=1/x$. Differentiating this function, we see that

$$g^\prime(x) = \frac{-1}{x^2} = -g(x)^2.$$

Other functions may not have the above property, but their derivative may be written in terms of functions like those above. For example, if we take the function $h(x)=e^x\log x$, we have that

$$h^\prime(x) = e^x\log x+x^{-1}e^x = h(x)+f(x)g(x).$$

Functions like these form the links in a so-called Pfaffian chain. Such a chain is a sequence of functions $f_1,f_2,\dots$ with the property that if we differentiate any of the functions in this chain then the result can be written in terms of the function itself and all the functions preceding it in the chain (specifically as a polynomial in those functions and the variables involved). Thus, with the functions above, we have that $f,g,h$ is a Pfaffian chain.

A Pfaffian function is then just a polynomial in the functions appearing in a Pfaffian chain and the function argument. So with the Pfaffian chain just mentioned, functions such as $F(x)=x^3f(x)^2-2g(x)h(x)$ are Pfaffian.

== Formal definition ==
Let $U$ be an open domain in $\R^n$. A Pfaffian chain of order $r\geq 0$ and degree $\alpha\geq 1$ in $U$ is a sequence of real analytic functions $f_1,\dots,f_r$ in $U$ satisfying differential equations

$$\frac{\partial f_{i}}{\partial x_j}=P_{i,j}(\boldsymbol{x},f_{1}(\boldsymbol{x}),\ldots,f_{i}(\boldsymbol{x}))$$

for $i=1,\dots,r$, where $P_{i,j}\in\R[x_1,\dots,x_n,y_1,\dots,y_i]$ are polynomials of degree less than or equal to $\alpha$. A function $f$ on $U$ is called a Pfaffian function of order $r$ and degree $(\alpha,\beta)$ if

$$f(\boldsymbol{x})=P(\boldsymbol{x},f_{1}(\boldsymbol{x}),\ldots,f_{r}(\boldsymbol{x})),\,$$

where $P\in\R[x_1,\dots,x_n,y_1,\dots,y_r]$ is a polynomial of degree $\beta\geq 1$. The numbers $r$, $\alpha$, and $\beta$ are collectively known as the format of the Pfaffian function, and give a useful measure of its complexity.

As an example, let us return to the functions from the previous section. Set $U=(0,\infty)\subseteq\R$, and let $f_1(x)=e^x$, $f_2(x)=1/x$, and $f_3(x)=e^x\log x$. These are all real analytic functions in $U$ satisfying the differential equations

$$f_1'(x)=P_1(x,f_1(x)),\quad f_2'(x)=P_2(x,f_1(x),f_2(x)),\quad f'_3(x)=P_3(x,f_1(x),f_2(x),f_3(x)),$$

where

$$P_1(x,y_1)=y_1,\quad P_2(x,y_1,y_2)=-y_2^2,\quad P_3(x,y_1,y_2,y_3)=y_1y_2+y_3$$

are all real polynomials of degree less than or equal to $2$. Thus $f_1,f_2,f_3$ is a Pfaffian chain of order $r=3$ and degree $\alpha=2$ in $U$. Furthermore, $f_3'$ is a Pfaffian function of order $3$ and degree $(2,\deg P_3)=(2,1)$.

== Examples ==
- The most trivial examples of Pfaffian functions are the polynomial functions. Such a function will be a polynomial $p$ in a Pfaffian chain of order $r=0$; that is, the chain with no functions. Such a function will have $\alpha=0$ and $\beta=\deg p$.
- Perhaps the simplest nontrivial Pfaffian function is $f(x)=e^x$. This is Pfaffian with order $r=1$ and $\alpha=\beta=1$ due to the differential equation $f'=f$.
- Recursively, one may define $f_1(x)=\exp(x)$ and $f_{m+1}(x) = \exp(f_m(x))$ for $1\leq m<r$. Then ${f_m}^\prime=f_1, f_2 \cdots f_m$. So this is a Pfaffian chain of order $r$ and degree $\alpha=r$.
- All of algebraic functions are Pfaffian on suitable domains, as are hyperbolic functions. Trigonometric functions on bounded intervals are Pfaffian, but they must be formed indirectly. For example, the function $\cos(x)$ is a polynomial in the Pfaffian chain $\tan(x/2),\cos^2(x/2)$ on the interval $(-\pi,\pi)$.
- In fact, all elementary functions and Liouvillian functions are Pfaffian. (Note: Liouville functions are essentially all the real analytic functions obtainable from the elementary functions by applying the usual arithmetic operations, exponentiation, and integration. They are unrelated to Liouville's function in number theory.)

== In model theory ==
Consider the structure $\R=(\R,+,-,\cdot,<,0,1)$, the ordered field of real numbers. Andrei Gabrielov proved that the structure obtained by starting with $\R$ and adding a function symbol for every analytic function restricted to the unit box $[0,1]^m$ is model complete. That is, any set definable in this structure $\R_{\textrm{an}}$ was just the projection of some higher-dimensional set defined by identities and inequalities involving these restricted analytic functions.

Alex Wilkie showed that one has the same result if instead of adding every restricted analytic function, one just adds the unrestricted exponential function to $\R$ to get the ordered real field with exponentiation, $\R_{\textrm{exp}}$, a result known as Wilkie's theorem. Wilkie also tackled the question of which finite sets of analytic functions could be added to $\R$ to get a model-completeness result. It turned out that adding any Pfaffian chain restricted to the box $[0,1]^m$ would give the same result. In particular one may add all Pfaffian functions to $\R$ to get the structure $\R_{\textrm{Pfaff}}$ as a variant of Gabrielov's result. The result on exponentiation is not a special case of this result (even though exp is a Pfaffian chain by itself), as it applies to the unrestricted exponential function.

Closely related to model-completeness are the results on o-minimality: the above result of Wilkie's proved that the structure $\R_{\textrm{Pfaff}}$ is an o-minimal structure, whereas van den Dries and Miller proved that the structure $\R_{\textrm{an},\textrm{exp}}$ combining restricted analytic functions and the unrestricted exponential function is o-minimal.

== Noetherian functions ==
The equations above that define a Pfaffian chain are said to satisfy a triangular condition, since the derivative of each successive function in the chain is a polynomial in one extra variable. Thus if they are written out in turn a triangular shape appears:

$$\begin{align}f_1^\prime &= P_1(x,f_1)\\
f_2^\prime &= P_2(x,f_1,f_2)\\
f_3^\prime &= P_3(x,f_1,f_2,f_3),\end{align}$$

and so on. If this triangularity condition is relaxed so that the derivative of each function in the chain is a polynomial in all the other functions in the chain, then the chain of functions is known as a Noetherian chain, and a function constructed as a polynomial in this chain is called a Noetherian function. So, for example, a Noetherian chain of order three is composed of three functions $f_1,f_2,f_3$, satisfying the equations

$$\begin{align}f_1^\prime &= P_1(x,f_1,f_2,f_3)\\
f_2^\prime &= P_2(x,f_1,f_2,f_3)\\
f_3^\prime &= P_3(x,f_1,f_2,f_3).\end{align}$$

The name stems from the fact that the ring generated by the functions in such a chain is Noetherian.

Any Pfaffian chain is also a Noetherian chain (the extra variables in each polynomial are simply redundant in this case), but not every Noetherian chain is Pfaffian: for example, if we take $f_1(x)=\sin(x)$ and $f_2(x)=\cos(x)$ then we have the equations

$$\begin{align}f_1^\prime(x) &= f_2(x)\\
f_2^\prime(x) &= -f_1(x),\end{align}$$

and these hold for all real numbers, so $f_1,f_2$ is a Noetherian chain on all of $\R$. But there is no polynomial $P(x,y)$ such that the derivative of $\sin(x)$ can be written as $P(x,\sin(x))$, and so this chain is not Pfaffian.
